The Muny, or the Municipal Opera Association of St. Louis, Missouri, in the United States, is a not-for-profit municipally-owned outdoor theatre, the largest in the United States. The Theater was built and opened in 1917 with 6 performances of Verdi's Aida. It operates solely in the summer, and its first official season ran from June to August 1919.  In the beginning, it presented the latest operas of the time, calling on local performers and national celebrities alike to perform for a short run of a one- to, on occasion, three-week run.  More recently, however, the Muny has shifted to presenting musicals, some old, some new, and some of the Muny's own creation.

Here follows a list of the many shows that the Muny has presented in its summer seasons, with known dates included. To date, the 1919 season is the only one to hold all new productions (being the first season).  By contrast, the 1946 and 1993 seasons have been the only summers where no new shows were added to the repertory.

Legend 

The superscript notes below denote first productions (premieres), world premieres, in-season concerts, etc. at the Muny.

Muny Premiere: MP
World Premiere at the Muny: WP
Concert Presentation: C
Ballet/Dance Event: B
Ice Show: I
Original Revue: R

1910s

1919 (Season 1) 
 Robin Hood MP 
 The Bohemian Girl MP
 El Capitan MP
 The Mikado MP
 The Wizard of the Nile MP
 Chimes of Normandy MP

 Featuring mayor Henry Kiel as King Richard

1920s

1920 (Season 2) 
 The Firefly MP
 Robin Hood
 Waltz Dream MP
 The Mikado
 Mascot MP
 The Gondoliers MP
 Babes in Toyland MP
 Katinka MP

1921 (Season 3) 
 June 7–12.  The Chocolate Soldier MP
 June 14–19.  Fra Diavolo MP
 June 21–26.  The Fortune Teller MP
 June 28 – July 3.  San Toy MP
 July 5–10.  The Beggar Student MP
 July 12–17.  The Pirates of Penzance MP
 July 19–24.  The Chimes of Normandy
 July 26–31.  Sari MP

1922 (Season 4) 
 June 6–11. The Highwayman MP
 June 13–18. Sweethearts MP
 June 20–25. Sari.  Eva Fallon, Arthur Geary.
 June 27 – July 2. The Yeomen of the Guard MP.  Frank Moulan.
 July 4–9. The Geisha MP
 July 11–16. The Spring Maid MP
 July 18–23. The Queen's Lace Handkerchief MP
 July 25–30. Miss Springtime MP.  Frank Moulan.

Kalman's Der Zigeunerprimas.Reinhardt's Die Sprudelfee.Kalman's Zsuzsi kisasszony.

1923 (Season 5) 
 Naughty Marietta MP
 Wang MP
 The Fencing Master MP
 Prince of Pilsen MP
 Die Fledermaus MP
 Sweethearts
 The Gypsy Baron MP
 The Merry Widow MP
 Gypsy Love MP
 The Spring Maid

1924 (Season 6) 
 Princess Chic MP
 The Firefly
 Florodora MP
 A Chinese Honeymoon MP
 The Bohemian Girl
 Prince of Pilsen
 The Fortune Teller
 Lilac Domino MP
 Naughty Marietta
 The Beggar Princess MP

1925 (Season 7) 
 A Night in Venice MP
 Mlle. Modiste MP
 Ruddigore MP
 Her Regiment MP
 Rob Roy MP
 Dolly Varden MP
 Lady in Ermine MP
 Cavalleria Rusticana MP
 H.M.S. Pinafore MP
 The Count of Luxembourg MP
 Martha MP
 Naughty Marietta
 The Merry Widow

1926 (Season 8) 
 Eileen MP
 The Red Mill MP
 The Chocolate Soldier
 Spring Maid
 The Pink Lady MP
 Il Trovatore MP
 Sweethearts
 Iolanthe MP
 The Count of Luxembourg
 Woodland MP
 Fra Diavolo
 Babes in Toyland

1927 (Season 9) 
 Robin Hood
 The Princess Pat MP
 Sari
 Song of the Flame MP
 The Red Mill
 Rose-Marie MP
 The Mikado
 The Dollar Princess MP
 Katinka
 The Serenade MP
 Gypsy Love
 The Tales of Hoffmann MP

1928 (Season 10) 
 Princess Flavia MP
 The Merry Widow
 The Vagabond King MP
 No, No, Nanette MP
 Rose-Marie
 The Student Prince MP
 Lady in Ermine
 Song of the Flame
 The Love Song MP
 Mary MP
 Aida 

 This was the first production of the Verdi opera in a complete season.  It had been previously performed in 1917 in the newly built amphitheater for the 13th Annual Convention of the St. Louis Advertising Club.

1929 (Season 11) 
 Love Call MP
 The Student Prince
 Wildflower MP
 Castles in the Air MP
 The Chocolate Soldier
 The Bohemian Girl
 Rose-Marie
 Prince of Pilsen
 The Enchantress MP
 The Vagabond King
 Babes in Toyland
 Golden Dawn MP

1930s

1930 (Season 12) 
 Nina Rosa MP
 The Circus Princess MP
 The Desert Song MP
 The New Moon MP
 Blossom Time MP
 Alone at Last MP
 The Red Robe MP
 Maytime MP
 Madame Pompadour MP
 The Student Prince
 Show Boat MP 

 Production starring W. C. Fields as Captain Andy.

1931 (Season 13) 
 Little Girls MP
 The Street Singer MP 
 Music in May MP
 Nina Rosa
 Rose-Marie
 Countess Maritza MP
 The Three Musketeers MP
 A Wonderful Night MP
 Irene MP
 Circus Princess
 Rio Rita MP

 Film actor Cary Grant, appearing under his real name Archibald Leach, was a repertory performer during the 1931 season before starting his screen career.  In addition to The Street Singer, Grant appeared in Music in May, Nina Rosa, The Three Musketeers, A Wonderful Night, Irene and Rio Rita.

1932 (Season 14) 
 The New Moon
 Riviera Girl MP
 The Last Waltz MP
 Blossom Time
 The Desert Song
 The Rose of Stamboul MP
 The Honeymooners MP
 The Blue Paradise MP
 Sari
 The Land of Smiles MP
 Love Call
 Cyrano de Bergerac MP

1933 (Season 15) 
 Bitter Sweet MP
 Florodora
 White Lilacs MP
 Rip Van Winkle MP
 The Student Prince
 The Nightingale MP
 Naughty Marietta
 My Maryland MP
 Beau Brummell MP
 Cat and the Fiddle MP
 The Desert Song

1934 (Season 16) 
 Sweet Adeline MP
 Cyrano de Bergerac
 The Last Waltz
 East Wind MP
 Mlle. Modiste
 Music in the Air MP
 The Rose of Algeria MP
 Sally MP
 The New Moon
 Show Boat

1935 (Season 17) 
 Teresina MP
 Rio Rita
 Madame Sherry MP
 The Chocolate Soldier
 Good News MP
 Vagabond King
 Sunny MP
 Beloved Rogue MP
 Cat and the Fiddle
 The Desert Song
 Roberta MP
 Whoopee! MP

1936 (Season 18) 
 Kid Boots MP
 The Three Musketeers
 No, No, Nanette
 Sons o' Guns MP
 The Bohemian Girl
 Oh, Boy! MP
 The Merry Widow
 The New Moon
 A Connecticut Yankee MP
 Bitter Sweet
 The Red Mill
 Glamorous Night MP

1937 (Season 19) 
 The Great Waltz MP
 The Fortune Teller
 Music in the Air
 Louis the XIV MP
 The Mikado
 Salute to Spring MP
 Prince of Pilsen
 The Bartered Bride MP
 The Pink Lady
 Robin Hood
 Babes in Toyland
 Wild Violets MP

1938 (Season 20) 
 Gentlemen Unafraid MP 
 Of Thee I Sing MP
 The White Horse Inn MP
 Roberta
 Virginia MP
 The Lost Waltz MP
 Chimes of Normandy
 Rosalie MP
 Knights of Song MP
 The Gingerbread Man MP
 Show Boat

 Production starring Red Skelton.

1939 (Season 21) 
 Rose-Marie
 Queen High MP
 The Lost Waltz
 Katinka MP
 Waltz Dream
 On Your Toes MP
 The Firefly
 The Bartered Bride
 Mary
 Babette MP
 Song of the Flame

1940s

1940 (Season 22) 
 The American Way MP
 Naughty Marietta
 Apple Blossoms MP
 Rio Rita
 The Chocolate Soldier
 Good News
 Knickerbocker Holiday MP
 Anything Goes MP
 East Wind
 Rosalie
 Babes in Arms MP
 The Great Waltz

1941 (Season 23) 
 New Orleans MP
 Sweethearts
 Too Many Girls MP
 The Firefly
 The Three Musketeers
 Irene
 Nina Rosa
 The Merry Widow
 Bitter Sweet
 The Desert Song
 The Red Mill
 Balalaika MP

1942 (Season 24) 
 Glamorous Night MP
 Sally
 Song of the Flame
 Hit the Deck MP
 No, No, Nanette
 The New Moon
 Girl Crazy MP
 Wildflower
 Roberta
 The Wizard of Oz MP
 Show Boat

1943 (Season 25) 
 Balalaika
 Sunny
 Rose-Marie
 Sons o' Guns
 The Chocolate Soldier
 The Great Waltz
 Rosalie
 The Desert Song
 Babes in Toyland
 The Merry Widow
 Chu Chin Chow MP

1944 (Season 26) 
 June 1–11 (11 nights). Open Road MP
 June 12–18.  Good News
 June 19–25.  The Vagabond King
 June 26 – July 2.  Eileen
 July 3–9.  Hit the Deck
 July 10–16.  Naughty Marietta
 July 17–23.  Music in the Air
 July 24–30.  Maytime
 July 31 – August 6.  Irene
 August 7–13.  The Bohemian Girl
 August 14–20.  The Red Mill
 August 21–27.  Rio Rita

1945 (Season 27) 
 June 7–17 (11 nights).  Jubilee MP
 June 18–24.  O'Brien Girl MP
 June 25 – July 1.  The Fortune Teller
 July 2–8.  The New Moon
 July 9–15.  Cat and the Fiddle
 July 16–22.  Madam Pompadour
 July 23–29.  The Firefly
 July 30 – August 5.  The Pink Lady
 August 6–12.  The Three Musketeers
 August 13–19.  Bitter Sweet
 August 20–26.  Sari
 August 27 – September 2.  Roberta

1946 (Season 28) 
 June 6–16 (11 nights).  The Desert Song
 June 17–23.  Mary
 June 24–30.  Gypsy Love
 July 1–7.  Rosalie
 July 8–14.  The Merry Widow
 July 15–21.  The Lost Waltz
 July 22–28.  East Wind
 July 29 – August 4.  Prince of Pilsen
 August 5–11.  Robin Hood
 August 12–18.  The Wizard of Oz WP 
 August 19 – September 1 (two weeks).  The Great Waltz

 New production for the Muny based on the 1939 MGM film; adapted by Frank Gabrielson.

1947 (Season 29) 
 June 5–15 (11 nights).  The Dancing Years MP 
 June 16–22.  Nina Rosa
 June 23–29.  No, No, Nanette
 June 30 – July 6.  Rose-Marie
 July 7–13.  Apple Blossoms
 July 14–20.  Die Fledermaus
 July 21–27.  Sally
 July 28 – August 3.  Chimes of Normandy
 August 4–10.  Naughty Marietta
 August 11–17.  Babes in Toyland
 August 18–31 (two weeks).  Show Boat

 Production featuring Marge Champion.

1948 (Season 30) 
 June 3–13 (11 nights).  Auld Lange Syne MP
 June 14–20.  Venus in Silk MP
 June 21–27.  Rio Rita
 June 28 – July 4.  Hit the Deck
 July 5–11.  The Three Musketeers
 July 12–18.  The White Eagle MP
 July 19–25.  Jubilee
 July 26 – August 1.  A Connecticut Yankee
 August 2–8.  Sunny
 August 9–15.  Sari
 August 16–29 (two weeks).  Up in Central Park MP

1949 (Season 31) 
 June 9–19 (11 nights).  The New Moon
 June 20–26.  Bloomer Girl MP
 June 27 – July 3.  The Fortune Teller
 July 4–10.  The Firefly
 July 11–17.  The Chocolate Soldier
 July 18–24.  Bitter Sweet
 July 25–31.  Irene
 August 1–7.  The Vagabond King
 August 8–14.  Roberta
 August 15–21.  The Red Mill
 August 22 – September 5 (15 nights).  Song of Norway MP

1950s

1950 (Season 32) 
 June 8–18 (11 nights).  Brigadoon MP
 June 19–25.  Rosalie
 June 26 – July 2.  East Wind
 July 3–9.  Of Thee I Sing
 July 10–16.  Robin Hood
 July 17–23.  Lady in the Dark MP
 July 24–30.  The Desert Song
 July 31 – August 6.  The Pink Lady
 August 7–13.  Whoopee!
 August 14–20.  Rodgers and Hammerstein Music Festival C
 August 21 – September 3 (two weeks).  Carousel MP

1951 (Season 33) 
 June 7–17 (11 nights).  Nina Rosa
 June 18–24.  High Button Shoes MP
 June 25 – July 1.  Music in the Air MP
 July 2–8.  Miss Liberty MP
 July 9–15.  Die Fledermaus
 July 16–22.  Girl Crazy
 July 23–29.  Rodgers and Hammerstein Music Festival C
 July 30 – August 5.  The Bohemian Girl
 August 6–12.  The Merry Widow
 August 13–19.  The Wizard of Oz
 August 20 – September 2 (two weeks).  The Great Waltz

1952 (Season 34) 
 June 5–15 (11 nights).  Show Boat
 June 16–22.  Sally
 June 23–29.  The Cat and the Fiddle
 June 30 – July 6.  Rose-Marie
 July 7–13.  The Student Prince
 July 14–20.  The Bartered Bride
 July 21–27.  Countess Maritza
 July 28 – August 3.  Mlle. Modiste
 August 4–10.  Naughty Marietta
 August 11–17.  Babes in Toyland
 August 18–31 (two weeks).  Annie Get Your Gun MP

1953 (Season 35) 
 June 4–14 (11 nights).  Up in Central Park
 June 15–21.  Bloomer Girl
 June 22–28.  Cyrano de Bergerac
 June 29 – July 5.  Rio Rita
 July 6–12.  Blossom Time
 July 13–19.  Rip Van Winkle
 July 20–26.  No, No, Nanette
 July 27 – August 2.  Carmen MP
 August 3–9.  One Touch of Venus MP
 August 10–16.  Bitter Sweet
 August 17–30 (two weeks).  Kiss Me, Kate MP

1954 (Season 36) 
 June 3–13 (11 nights).  Call Me Madam MP
 June 14–20.  The New Moon
 June 21–27.  Song of Norway
 June 28 – July 4.  Roberta
 July 5–11.  The Mikado
 July 12–18.  Gentlemen Prefer Blondes MP
 July 19–25.  The Three Musketeers
 July 26 – August 1.  Panama Hattie MP
 August 2–8.  Where's Charley? MP
 August 9–15.  The Red Mill
 August 16–29 (two weeks).  Oklahoma! MP

1955 (Season 37) 
 June 2–12 (11 nights).  The Merry Widow
 June 13–19.  Brigadoon
 June 20–26.  Wonderful Town MP
 June 27 – July 3.  The Vagabond King
 July 4–10.  Guys and Dolls MP
 July 11–17.  The Desert Song
 July 18–24.  Rodgers and Hammerstein in Concert C
 July 25–31.  Carousel
 August 1–7.  Allegro MP
 August 8–14.  The King and I MP
 August 15–28 (two weeks).  South Pacific MP

1956 (Season 38) 
 June 7–17 (11 nights).  Annie Get Your Gun
 June 18–24.  Paint Your Wagon MP
 June 25 – July 1.  The Student Prince
 July 2–8.  Hit the Deck
 July 9–15.  The Great Waltz
 July 16–22.  The Chocolate Soldier
 July 23–29.  Wish You Were Here MP
 July 30 – August 5.  Kiss Me, Kate
 August 6–12.  An Evening of Great Music WP
 August 13–19.  Peter Pan MP
 August 20 – September 2 (two weeks).  Kismet MP

1957 (Season 39) 
 June 6–16  (11 nights).  South Pacific
 June 17–23.  Plain and Fancy MP. 
 June 24–30.  Damn Yankees MP
 July 1–7.  The New Moon
 July 8–14.  Guys and Dolls
 July 15–21.  Irene
 July 22–28.  Naughty Marietta
 July 29 – August 4.  Can-Can MP
 August 5–11.  An Evening of Great Music
 August 12–18.  The Wizard of Oz 
 August 19 – September 1 (two weeks).  The Pajama Game MP

 Production featuring Margaret Hamilton as the Wicked Witch.

1958 (Season 40) 
 June 5–15 (11 nights)  Show Boat.  Andy Devine, Marion Marlowe.
 June 16–22.  Roberta.  Bob Hope.
 June 23–29.  Silk Stockings MP.  Dolores Gray, Norwood Smith.
 June 30 – July 6.  Rose-Marie.  Elaine Malbin, Paul Gilbert.
 July 7–13.  Lady in the Dark.  Dolores Gray, Hans Conried.
 July 14–20.  On the Town MP.  Mary McCarty, Paul Gilbert.
 July 21–27.  Rosalinda MP.  Jean Fenn, Hans Conried.
 July 28 – August 3.  Happy Hunting MP.  Allan Jones, Penny Singleton, Virginia Gibson.
 August 4–10.  Finian's Rainbow MP.  Will Mahoney, Virginia Gibson.
 August 11–17.  Hansel and Gretel/Nutcracker Ballet (Act II) MP.
 August 18–31 (two weeks).  Oklahoma!.  Dorothy Collins, Helen Gallagher.

1959 (Season 41) 
 June 11–21 (11 nights).  The King and I.  Patricia Morison, Tony Dexter.
 June 22–28.  Song of Norway.  Claramae Turner, Stephen Douglass, Hans Conried, Lee Venora.
 June 29 – July 5.  Oh, Captain! MP.  Denise Darcel, Martyn Green, Doretta Morrow, Wilbur Evans.
 July 6–12.  Rio Rita.  Stephen Douglass, Larry Storch.
 July 13–19.  Gentlemen Prefer Blondes.  Maureen Cannon, Russell Nype.
 July 20–26.  Fanny MP.  Wilbur Evans, Robert Penn.
 July 27 – August 2.  Li'l Abner MP.  Stephen Douglass, Virginia Gibson.
 August 3–9.  Carmen.  Jean Madeira, Robert Rounseville.
 August 10–16.  Call Me Madam.  Penny Singleton, Russell Nype.
 August 17–23.  Babes in Toyland.  Rowan and Martin.
 August 24 – September 6 (two weeks).  Bells Are Ringing MP.  Julius La Rosa, Jacqueline James.

1960s

1960 (Season 42) 
 June 9–19 (11 nights).  Meet Me in St. Louis MP.  Peggy King, Virginia Gibson, Mary Wickes, Howard St. John.
 June 20–26.  Kismet.  Gene Barry.
 June 27 – July 3.  Anything Goes.  Andy Devine, Bill Hayes, Julie Wilson.
 July 4–10.  The Desert Song.  Stephen Douglass, Elaine Malbin.
 July 11–17.  The Student Prince.  Richard Banke, Jacquelyn McKeever.
 July 18–24.  Tom Sawyer MP.  Timmy Everett, Danny Meehan.
 July 25–31.  Rosalie.  Dorothy Collins, Bobby Van, Arthur Treacher.
 August 1–7.  Madame Butterfly  Irene Jordan, Robert Rounseville, Walter Cassel.
 August 8–14.  Knights of Song.  Martyn Green , Earl Wrightson, Lois Hunt.
 August 15–21.  The Red Mill.  Rowan & Martin.
 August 22 – September 4 (two weeks).  Redhead MP.  Helen Gallagher, Peter Palmer.

 This was Martyn Green's first public appearance since his accident in 1959 which resulted in the amputation of one of his legs.

1961 (Season 43) 
 June 12–25 (two weeks).  Calamity Jane MP.  Edith Adams, George Gaynes, Allyn Ann McLerie.
 June 26 – July 2.  Take Me Along MP.  Jack Carson, Betty White, Wilbur Evans.
 July 3–9.  The Great Waltz.  Shepperd Strudwick, Monte Amundsen.
 July 10–16.  Kiss Me, Kate.  Patricia Morison, Earl Wrightson, Peggy King.
 July 17–23.  Destry Rides Again MP.  Anne Jefreys, Tom Poston.
 July 24–30.  Robin Hood.  Frank Porretta, Monte Amudnsen.
 July 31 – August 6.  Wish You Were Here.  Sheree North, Marty Allen, Steve Rossi.
 August 7–13.  Can-Can.  Dolores Gray, Norwood Smith, Jack Gilford.
 August 14–20.  Cinderella MP.  Tommy Rall.
 August 21 – September 3 (two weeks).  Flower Drum Song MP.  Yau Shan-Tung, Tim Herbert, Juanita Hall, Devra Korwin.

1962 (Season 44) 
 June 11–24 (two weeks).  Around the World in 80 Days MP .  Cyril Ritchard, Pierre Olaf.
 June 25 – July 1.  Molly Darling MP
 July 2–8.  The Pajama Game.  Dolores Gray, Stephen Douglass, Helen Gallagher.
 July 9–15.  Mexican Holidays MP
 July 16–22.  Bye Bye Birdie MP.  Gretchen Wyler, Dick Patterson.
 July 23–29.  Annie Get Your Gun.  Dolores Gray, Art Lund.
 July 30 – August 5.  Blossom Time
 August 6–12.  Oklahoma!.  Peter Palmer, Louise O'Brien.
 August 13–19.  The Wizard of Oz
 August 20 – September 2 (two weeks).  The Music Man MP.  Norwood Smith, Jacquelyn McKeever, Iggie Wolfington.

 This was not the 1946 Cole Porter musical as previously identified here, but a musical version of Jules Verne's story with music by Sammy Fain.

1963 (Season 45) 
 June 10–23 (two weeks).  Carnival! MP.  Susan Watson, Stephen Douglass, Edward Villella, James Mitchell, Jo Anne Worley.
 June 24–30.  I Dream of Jeanie MP
 July 1–7.  Li'l Abner.  Bruce Yarnell, Virginia Gibson.
 July 8–14.  Brigadoon.  Robert Horton.
 July 15–21.  The Unsinkable Molly Brown MP.  Dolores Gray, Bruce Yarnell.
 July 22–28.  Babes in Toyland.  Rowan & Martin.
 July 29 – August 4.  The King and I.  Betty White, Charles Korvin.
 August 5–11.  Gypsy MP.  Evelyn Brooks, Alfred Sandor, Susan Watson .
 August 12–18.  South Pacific.  Giorgio Tozzi, Elizabeth Allen, Cliff Norton.
 August 19 – September 1.  West Side Story MP.  Lee Venora, David Holliday.

Brooks and Watson were late substitutes for the originally cast Jacqueline James and Arlene Fontana.

1964 (Season 46) 
 June 8–21 (two weeks).  My Fair Lady MP.  Tom Helmore, Lola Fisher.
 June 22–28.  Show Boat.  Andy Devine, Wynne Miller, Mary Wickes, William Lewis.
 June 29 – July 5.  Mr. President MP.  Forrest Tucker, Evelyn Brooks.
 July 6–12.  Carousel.  Bruce Yarnell, Marcia King, Wynne Miller, Robert Rounseville, Claramae Turner.
 July 13–19.  Tom Sawyer
 July 20–26.  Milk and Honey MP.  Molly Picon, Patricia Morison, Walter Cassel, Tommy Rall.
 July 27 – August 2.  Damn Yankees.  Eddie Bracken, Helen Gallagher.
 August 3–9.  The Boys from Syracuse MP.  Mary McCarty.
 August 10–16.  Porgy and Bess MP.  Cab Calloway.
 August 17 – September 6 (three weeks).  The Sound of Music MP.  Wynne Miller, Shev Rodgers, Claramae Turner.

This was one of only two shows to be booked for three weeks at the Muny, Camelot the next season being the other.  Wynne Miller was a late substitute for the originally cast Barbara Cook.

1965 (Season 47) 
 June 7–20 (two weeks).  Meet Me in St. Louis.  Anita Gillette, Mary Wickes.
 June 21–27.  Guys and Dolls.  Macdonald Carey, Patrice Wymore, Joey Faye, Wynne Miller.
 June 28 – July 4.  Here's Love MP.  Marion Marlowe, Jack Haskell, Jack Harrold.
 July 5–11.  110 in the Shade MP.  Gretchen Wyler, Bruce Yarnell, Art Lund.
 July 12–18.  Little Me MP.  Donald O'Connor, Virginia Martin, Nancy Andrews.
 July 19–25.  Cinderella.  William Lewis, Judith McCauley.
 July 26 – August 1.  The Student Prince.  William Lewis, Patricia Welting.
 August 2–8.  High Button Shoes.  Paul Gilbert, Marge Champion, Russell Arms.
 August 9–15.  Flower Drum Song.  Jack Soo.
 August 16 – September 5 (three weeks).  Camelot MP.  Pernell Roberts, Margot Moser, Bruce Yarnell.

1966 (Season 48) 
 June 6–19 (two weeks).  The Music Man.  Eddie Albert, Margot Moser, Mary Wickes, The Buffalo Bills.
 June 20–26.  Good News.  Peter Palmer, Nancy Dussault, Karen Morrow.
 June 27 – July 3.  Kiss Me, Kate.  Patrice Munsel, Bob Wright.
 July 4–10.  The Desert Song.  William Walker, Claire Alexander, William Lewis.
 July 11–17.  Can-Can.  Jane Morgan.
 July 18–24.  Bye Bye Birdie.  Gretchen Wyler, Dick Patterson.
 July 25–31.  Oklahoma!.  Robert Horton.
 August 1–7.  Bells Are Ringing.  Allen Ludden, Betty White.
 August 8–14.  Hansel and Gretel / Act II of The Nutcracker Ballet.  Claramae Turner, Margaret Roggero, Monte Amundsen; Patricia Klekovic, Kenneth Johnson.
 August 15–28.  How to Succeed in Business Without Really Trying MP.  Billy DeWolfe, Len Gochman.

1967 (Season 49) 
 June 5–18 (two weeks).  West Side Story.  Anna Maria Alberghetti.
 June 19–25.  Wish You Were Here.  James Darren and Sergio Franchi
, Sdergio
 June 26 – July 2.  Do I Hear a Waltz? MP.  Dorothy Collins, Enzo Stuarti, Monique Van Vooren.
 July 3–9.  It's a Bird... It's a Plane... It's Superman MP.  Bob Holiday, Charles Nelson Reilly, Karen Morrow, Richard France.
 July 10–16.  The New Moon.  Bruce Yarnell, Margot Moser, William Lewis.
 July 17–23.  The Unsinkable Molly Brown.  Kaye Stevens, Bruce Yarnell.
 July 24–30.  Funny Girl MP.  Marilyn Michaels, Danny Carroll, Molly Picon, Norwood Smith.
No show July 31.
Special Added Attraction: The Royal Ballet, featuring Rudolf Nureyev and Margot Fonteyn
 August 1–2.  Swan Lake
 August 3–4.  Giselle
 August 5–6.  Romeo and Juliet
Regular Season continues:
 August 7–13.  On a Clear Day You Can See Forever MP.  Linda Lavin.
 August 14–20.  Gypsy.  Jane Morgan, Jessica Walter.
 August 21 – September 3 (two weeks).  The King and I.  Ann Blyth, Pernell Roberts.

Van Johnson was originally set to star as Dr. Mark Bruckner but dropped out.

1968 (Season 50) 
 June 3–16 (two weeks).  My Fair Lady.  Douglas Fairbanks, Jr., Margot Moser, Eddie Albert.
 June 17–23.  The Pajama Game.  John Raitt, Jaye P. Morgan.
 June 24–30.  Annie Get Your Gun.  Kaye Stevens, Bruce Yarnell.
 July 1–7.  The Merry Widow.  Jean Pierre Aumont.
 July 8–14.  Brigadoon.  Ann Blyth, Bill Hayes, Bert Parks.
 July 15–21.  Carousel.  John Davidson.
 July 22–28.  Call Me Madam.  Ethel Merman, Richard Eastham, Russell Nype.
Special Attractions to Celebrate the Muny's 50th Season:
 July 29 – August 3.  Hello, Dolly! MP.  Pearl Bailey, Cab Calloway.
 August 4.  Herb Alpert and the Tijuana Bass C
The Regular Season continues:
 August 5–11.  Show Boat.  Arthur Godfrey.
 August 12–18.  The Wizard of Oz.  Tom Poston, Lana Cantrell.
 August 19 – September 1.  The Sound of Music.  Florence Henderson, Bob Wright.

Constance Towers was cast as the Merry Widow but dropped out shortly before rehearsals.
Featuring 19-year-old Vicki Lawrence as Carrie Pipperidge.
The Broadway production closed for a week to play this special engagement.

1969 (Season 51) 
 June 2–15 (two weeks).  State Fair WP.  Ozzie and Harriet Nelson.
 June 16–22.  Kismet
 June 23–29.  Camelot.  Sally Ann Howes, John Cullum.
 June 30 – July 6.  The Most Happy Fella MP
 July 7–20 (two weeks).  Mame MP.  Jane Morgan.
 July 21–27.  The Royal Ballet B
 July 28 – August 3.  Damn Yankees . Ray Walston, Cyd Charisse.
 August 4–10.  Guys and Dolls.  Barbara McNair, Jane Kean, Bill Elliott, Soupy Sales, Lou Thesz.
 August 11–17.  South Pacific.  Earl Wrightson, Lesley Gore, Ray Walston.
 August 18–31 (two weeks).  Snow White and the Seven Dwarfs MP

Reorchestrated as a "rock" musical for a "contemporary" sound.

1970s

1970 (Season 52) 
Pre-Season Concerts
 The Red Skelton Show C
 An Evening with Burt Bacharach C
 The Engelbert Humperdinck Show C
The Regular Season
 July 6–12.  Promises, Promises MP .  Jerry Orbach.
 July 13–19.  Oliver! MP.  Sid Caesar.
 July 20–26.  Man of La Mancha MP.  Ed Ames.
 July 27 – August 2.  Oklahoma!.  Jerry Lanning, Susan Watson, Bert Parks.
 August 3–9.  How to Succeed in Business Without Really Trying.  Robert Morse.
 August 10–16.  George M! MP.  Joel Grey.
 August 17–30 (two weeks).  Fiddler on the Roof MP.  Robert Merrill.
No show August 31.
 September 1–6.  The Moiseyev Dance Company B

The Broadway production closed for a week to play this engagement.

1971 (Season 53) 
Special Preseason Engagement
 June 14–20.  The Stuttgart Ballet B
Regular Season
 June 28 – July 4.  Hello, Dolly!.  Pearl Bailey.
 July 5–11.  Applause MP.  Lauren Bacall.
A week of concerts, July 12–18:
 The Glen Campbell Show C
 The Diahann Carroll Show C
 The Jim Nabors Show C
 The Jimmy Durante Show C
 The Robert Goulet Show C
Regular Season continues:
 July 19–25.  Sweet Charity MP.  Juliet Prowse.
 July 26 – August 1.  The Music Man.  Peter Marshall, Jack Bailey, Mary Wickes, Jackie Coogan, Cass Daley.
 August 2–8.  Two by Two MP.  Milton Berle.
 August 9–15.  The Unsinkable Molly Brown.  Barbara Eden, Jerry Lanning.
 August 16–22.  Cabaret MP.  Joel Grey.
 August 23–29.  The King and I.  Roberta Peters, James Shigeta.
 August 30 – September 5.  This Is Show Business MP.  Betty Grable, Dorothy Lamour, Don Ameche, Dennis Day, Rudy Vallee, Chita Rivera.

The Broadway production closed for a week for this engagement.

1972 (Season 54) 
 July 3–9.  Follies MP .  Alexis Smith, Gene Nelson, Dorothy Collins, John McMartin, Yvonne De Carlo.
A week of concerts, not considered part of the regular season.
 July 10.  The Carpenters; Skiles and HendersonC
 July 11.  The Big Show of 1936 MP.  Ben Blue, Jackie Coogan, Cass Daley, The Ink Spots.
 July 12.  Dinah Shore, Peter Nero C
 July 13.  Pearl Bailey C
 July 14–15.  Sonny & Cher C
 July 16.  Jim Nabors C
No show on July 17.
 July 18–23.  Ukrainian Dance Company B
 July 24–30.  1776 MP.  William Daniels, Howard Da Silva, Jerry Lanning.
 July 31 – August 6.  The Liza Minnelli Show C
 August 7–13.  Snow White and the Seven Dwarfs
 August 14–20.  Anything Goes.  Ann Miller, Pat Paulsen.
 August 21–27.  The Student Prince.  Frank Porretta, Hans Conried, Mary Wickes.
 August 28 – September 3.  The Sound of Music.  Jane Powell, Joseph Campanella.

 This was the Broadway production which had closed the week before.  The week at the Muny preceded engagements in Los Angeles and San Francisco.

1973 (Season 55) 
Pre-Season Special
 June 29 – July 1.  The Carroll O'Connor Show C
The Regular Season
 July 2–8.  No, No, Nanette.  Don Ameche, Evelyn Keyes, Ann B. Davis.
 July 9–15.  South Pacific.  Jerome Hines and Mary Travers. 
 July 16–22.  Fiddler on the Roof.  Herschel Bernardi.
 July 23–29.  Seesaw MP.  Michele Lee, John Gavin.
 July 30 – August 5.  Lorelei MP.  Carol Channing.
 August 6–12.  Irene.  Debbie Reynolds.
 August 13–19.  Bolshoi Ballet B
 August 20–26.  Two Gentlemen of Verona MP
 August 28 – September 9 (13 nights).  Gigi MP.  Alfred Drake, Agnes Moorehead, Daniel Massey, Maria Karnilova.

The Broadway production closed for a week to play this Muny engagement.Pre-Broadway tour.

1974 (Season 56) 
 July 1–7.  Take Me Along.  Gene Kelly.
 July 8–14.  Over Here!  MP .  The Andrews Sisters.
 July 15–21.  I Do! I Do! MP.  Carol Burnett, Rock Hudson.
 July 22–28.  Man of La Mancha.  Herschel Bernardi.
 July 29 – August 4.  Gypsy .  Angela Lansbury.
 August 5–11.  Good News .  Alice Faye, John Payne, Stubby Kaye.
 August 12–18.  Bitter Sweet.  Roberta Peters.
 August 19–25.  Mack and Mabel MP .  Robert Preston, Bernadette Peters.
 August 26 – September 1.  The Moiseyev Dance Company B

The Broadway production closed for a week to play this engagement. Pre-Broadway tour.

1975 (Season 57) 
 June 30 – July 6.  The Bolshoi Ballet B.  June 30 and July 6 Swan Lake.  July 1 Don Quixote - Act I.  Act II consisted of divertissements.  July 2 and July 5  Giselle.  July 3 and 4 Spartacus.
 July 7–13.  The Odd Couple MP .  Tony Randall, Jack Klugman.
 July 14–20.  Carousel.  Ed Ames.
 July 21–27.  Funny Girl.  Carol Lawrence, Harve Presnell, Sylvia Syms.
 July 28 – August 3.  Camelot.  David Birney, Tricia O'Neil, John Carradine.
 August 4–10.  Girl Crazy.  Dolores Gray, Ann Reinking.
 August 11–17.  The Wizard of Oz.  The Hudson Brothers, Margaret Hamilton, Karen Wyman.
 August 18–24.  Kiss Me, Kate.  Ann Blyth, Richard Fredricks.
 August 25–31.  The Mitzi Gaynor Show C

This was the only time in its history the Muny presented a nonmusical play.

1976 (Season 58) 
Muny Salutes '76, a series of preseason concerts for the Bicentennial of the United States
 June 26.  Leonard Bernstein New York Philharmonic C
 June 27.  Andre Kostelanetz New York Philharmonic C
 June 28–30.  Al Hirt's Impressions of New Orleans C
 July 1–2.  Grand Ole Muny Opera C
 July 3–4.  Burt Bacharach and Anthony Newley C
The Regular Season
 July 5–11.  Fiddler on the Roof.  Zero Mostel.
 July 12–18.  Mame.  Angela Lansbury, Anne Francine, Jane Connell.
 July 19–25.  On the Town.  The Hudson Brothers.
 July 26 – August 1.  Show Boat.  Shirley Jones, Gale Gordon, Ron Husmann, Kelly Garrett.
 August 2–8.  The King and I.  Yul Brynner, Constance Towers.
 August 9–15.  Oliver!.  Vincent Price.
 August 16–22.  The Baker's Wife MP .  Topol, Patti LuPone, Kurt Peterson, Keene Curtis.
 August 23–29.  Russian Festival of Music and Dance C B
 August 30 – September 5.  1776.  Peter Graves, Howard Da Silva.

 Pre-Broadway tryout (although the show closed before it ever got to Broadway).

1977 (Season 59) 
 June 27 – July 3.  Meet Me in St. Louis.  Alan Young, Mary Wickes, Julia Meade, Karen Wyman.
 July 4–10.  Hello, Dolly!  Carol Channing.
 July 11–17.  Finian's Rainbow.  Paul Williams, Nancy Dussault.
 July 18–24.  Guys and Dolls.  Leslie Uggams, Richard Roundtree.
 July 25–31.  Wonderful Town.  Lauren Bacall.
 August 1–7.  The Sound of Music.  Shirley Jones.
 August 8–14.  Kismet.  Len Cariou, Virginia Martin, George Rose.
 August 15–21.  Porgy and Bess.  Houston Grand Opera.
 August 22–28.  Sweet Charity.  Carol Lawrence.
 August 29 – September 4.  Chicago MP .  Jerry Orbach.

The Broadway production was scheduled to close for one week for this engagement then return to Broadway.  As it turned out, the Broadway show closed the Saturday before the Muny engagement, August 27, 1977.

1978 (Season 60) 
 June 19–25.  Seven Brides for Seven Brothers MP.  Jane Powell, Howard Keel.
 June 26 – July 9 (two weeks).  Annie MP
 July 10–16.  Man of La Mancha.  Ed Ames.
 July 17–23.  Oklahoma!
 July 24–30.  The Music Man.  Tony Randall.
 July 31 – August 6.  Madame Butterfly
 August 7–13.  Damn Yankees.  Vincent Price, Michele Lee.
 August 14–20.  Dutch National Ballet B.  Rudolf Nureyev.
 August 21–27.  Peter Pan

National touring company.

1979 (Season 61) 
 June 25 – July 1.  My Fair Lady.  David Birney, Anita Gillette, Milo O'Shea.
 July 2–8.  A Funny Thing Happened on the Way to the Forum MP.  Arte Johnson, Hans Conried, Avery Schreiber, John Carradine, Benny Baker.
 July 9–15.  Shenandoah MP.  Ed Ames.
 July 16–22.  Brigadoon.  John McCook, Victoria Mallory.
 July 23–29.  The Desert Song.  Ann Blyth, Richard Fredricks, Alan Sues.
 July 30 – August 5.  Carousel.  Robert Goulet.
 August 6–12.  Tom Sawyer.  Don Grady, William Lonsdale Hurst.
 August 13–19.  Sugar MP.  Robert Morse, Ken Berry, Donald O'Connor.
 August 20–26.  Ballroom MP.  Janis Paige, Forrest Tucker.
 August 27 – September 2.  Bells Are Ringing.  Florence Henderson, Dean Jones.

Don Grady, age 35(!), played Huckleberry Finn.

1980s

1980 (Season 62) 
Preseason Special Attraction
 Richard Rodgers in Concert C.  With Walter Cronkite and Marsha Mason as narrators.
Regular Season:
 June 23–29.  South Pacific.  Florence Henderson, Giorgio Tozzi.
 June 30 – July 6.  The Debbie Reynolds Show C
 July 7–13.  Carnival!  Robert Conrad, Marti Rolph, Swen Swenson.
 July 14–20.  Bye Bye Birdie.  Chita Rivera, Russ Tamblyn, Audrey Christie.
 July 21–27.  Little Me.  Donald O'Connor, Eve Arden.
 July 28 – August 3.  Li'l Abner.  Joe Namath.
 August 4–10.  Cinderella
 August 11–17.  Al Jolson Tonight! MP  Larry Kert.
 August 18–24.  The Merry Widow.  Roberta Peters, Ron Husmann.
 August 25 – September 7 (two weeks).  Sugar Babies MP.  Carol Channing, Robert Morse.

Presented as a pre-Broadway tryout tour, but it never made it to Broadway.

1981 (Season 63) 
 June 15–21.  Kiss Me, Kate.  Robert Goulet, Leigh Beery.
 June 22–28.  Flower Drum Song.  Pat Suzuki, Khigh Dhiegh.
 June 29 – July 5.  George M!  Ken Berry.
 July 6–12.  Camelot.  Richard Harris.
 July 13–19.  Annie Get Your Gun.  Florence Henderson, Ron Husmann.
 July 20–26.  Show Boat.  Van Johnson.
 July 27 – August 2.  A Grand Night for Singing MP .
 August 3–9.  Hans Christian Andersen MP.  Larry Kert.
 August 10–16.  How to Succeed in Business Without Really Trying.  Fred Grandy, Don Ameche.
 August 17–23.  The Mitzi Gaynor Show C
 August 24–30.  A Chorus Line MP

Pat Suzuki, 23 years earlier the original Broadway Linda Low, was cast here as Madam Liang.Not, as the title might imply, an evening of Rodgers and Hammerstein, but a concert of opera and operetta scenes and arias, including the entire second act of Die Fledermaus.

1982 (Season 64) 
 June 21–27.  Fiddler on the Roof.  Paul Lipson.
 June 28 – July 4.  The Unsinkable Molly Brown.  Ann Reinking.
 July 5–11.  The Sound of Music.  Victoria Mallory, George Peppard.
 July 12–18.  Gigi.  Larry Kert, Robert Wright, Gloria DeHaven, Anne Francine.
 July 19–25.  Anything Goes.  Chita Rivera, Larry Kert, Iggie Wolfington.
 July 26 – August 1.  West Side Story.  Barry Williams, Christine Andreas.
 August 2–8.  Grease MP.
 August 9–15.  They're Playing Our Song MP.  Lucie Arnaz, Laurence Luckinbill.
 August 16–22.  Where's Charley?.  Robert Morse, Edie Adams.
 August 23–29.  The Wiz MP.
 August 30 – September 5 .  A Chorus Line.

A touring production of Hello, Dolly! was originally scheduled to close the season, but was cancelled by James Nederlander. The touring A Chorus Line was substituted, thus being presented for two summers in a row.

1983 (Season 65) 
 June 20–26.  The King and I.  Lynn Redgrave, Michael Kermoyan.
 June 27 – July 3.  Promises, Promises.  John James.
 July 4–10.  Can-Can.  Judy Kaye, John Reardon.
 July 11–17.  Annie.  Martha Raye.
 July 18–24.  Pal Joey MP.  Joel Grey, Alexis Smith.
 July 25–31.  High Button Shoes.  Gavin MacLeod.
 August 1–7.  Man of La Mancha.  John Raitt.
 August 8–14.  Mikhail Baryshnikov: An Evening of Classical Ballet B
 August 15–21.  Camelot.  Richard Harris.
 August 22–28.  The Pirates of Penzance.  William Katt, Maria Muldaur, George Rose
 August 29 – September 4.  I Do! I Do!.  Lucie Arnaz, Laurence Luckinbill.

1984 (Season 66) 
 July 9–15.  The Music Man.  Jim Dale, Pam Dawber.
 July 16–22.  Dream Street MP
 July 23–29.  Funny Girl.  Juliet Prowse, Larry Kert.
 July 30 – August 5.  Oklahoma!.  John Davidson.
 August 6–12.  Sugar Babies.  Mickey Rooney, Ann Miller.
 August 13–19.  Sleeping Beauty
 

This was not the Tchaikovsky ballet, as previously designated here, but a new stage musical version of the classic fairy tale.  The score was a kind of mishmash of various things, including some Tchaikovsky, for instance, his Waltz of the Flowers from The Nutcracker.This was the shortest Muny season since the opening seasons over sixty years earlier.  The original intention was to close the season with the touring production of My One and Only, to play the Fox Theater instead of the Muny, but the engagement was cancelled.

1985 (Season 67) 
 June 17–23.  A Chorus Line.  Donna McKechnie, Nicholas Dante.
 June 24–30.  My Fair Lady.  Michael Allinson, Victoria Mallory.
 no show the week that includes July 4
 July 8–14.  Fantasy on Ice I.  Dorothy Hamill.
 July 15–21.  Dancin' MP
 July 22–28.  Jesus Christ Superstar MP.  Anthony Geary, Carl Anderson.
 August 5–11.  Evita MP.  Florence Lacey
 August 12–18.  42nd Street MP.  Elizabeth Allen.

1986 (Season 68) 
 June 16–22.  42nd Street.  Elizabeth Allen.
 June 23–29.  Singin' in the Rain MP.  Donn Simeone, Brad Moranz, Cynthia Ferrer.
 no show the week that includes July 4
 July 7–13.  Swan Lake B.  La Scala Ballet Company.
 July 14–20.  Show Boat.  Eddie Bracken, Susan Powell, Ron Raines.
 July 21–27.  La Cage aux Folles MP.  Peter Marshall, Keene Curtis.
 July 28 – August 3.  Pippin MP.  Ben Vereen.
 August 4–10.  Gentlemen Prefer Blondes.  Morgan Fairchild, Debbie Shapiro.
 August 11–17.  Shenandoah.  John Cullum.
 August 18–24.  The Diary of Adam and Eve from The Apple Tree MP and Joseph and the Amazing Technicolor Dreamcoat MP.  Rex Smith (as Adam and Joseph) and Donna McKechnie (as Eve and the Narrator).

Since 42nd Street closed the previous season and opened this one, it's the only time in Muny history that season ticket holders sat through the same show in consecutive bookings.The MGM movie classic starred Gene Kelly, Donald O'Connor and Debbie Reynolds, all of whom appeared at the Muny in the 1970s.In Franco Zeffirelli's production.

1987 (Season 69) 
 June 15–21.  The Sound of Music.  Debby Boone, David Cryer.
 June 22–28.  My One and Only MP .  Tommy Tune, Stephanie Zimbalist.
 July 6–12.  Cats MP .
 July 13–19.  Fiddler on the Roof.  Theodore Bikel, Thelma Lee, Ruth Jaroslow.
 July 20–26.  Peter Pan.  Cathy Rigby, John Schuck.
 August 3–9.  Around the World in 80 Days.  Tony Randall, Robert Clary.
 August 10–16.  Big River MP

My One and Only was based on the Gershwin musical Funny Face which originally starred Fred Astaire on Broadway in 1927 and in a musical movie of the same name in 1957.  This Muny presentation opened the day Fred Astaire died ... and it was rained out; a bad day all around.For the second show in a row, the opening night, which was a sellout, was rained out.

1988 (Season 70) 
 June 20–26.  The Music Man.  John Davidson
 July 11–17.  Porgy and Bess.
 July 18–24.  The Mystery of Edwin Drood MP.  Jean Stapleton, Clive Revill.
 July 25–31.  Oliver!  Orson Bean.
 August 1–7.  Man of La Mancha.  Hal Linden.
 August 8–14.  Grease.  Jack Wagner.
 August 15–21.  Carousel.  Rex Smith, Stephanie Zimbalist, Patrice Munsel.

1989 (Season 71) 
 June 5–11.  A Chorus Line.  Donna McKechnie.
 June 19–25.  Gypsy.  Tyne Daly.
 July 17–23.  The King and I.  Stacy Keach, Mary Beth Peil.
 July 24–30.  Evita.  Saundra Santiago.
 July 31 – August 6.  Godspell MP.  Adrian Zmed, Stephen Lehew.
 August 14–20.  The Unsinkable Molly Brown.  Debbie Reynolds, Harve Presnell.
 August 21–27.  Annie.  Jo Anne Worley.

1990s

1990 (Season 72) 
 June 25 – July 1.  West Side Story
 July 2–8.  Jesus Christ Superstar.  Stephen Lehew.
 July 9–15.  Bye Bye Birdie.  Tommy Tune, Ann Reinking, Alan Sues.
 July 23–29.  Rodgers and Hammerstein's Cinderella on Ice.  Adolph Green, Phyllis Newman, Gretchen Wyler, Nancy Dussault.
 July 30 – August 5.  Brigadoon.  John James, Joel Higgins, Victoria Mallory.
 August 6–12.  No, No, Nanette.  Van Johnson, Carol Lawrence, Marge Champion.
 August 13–19.  Little Shop of Horrors MP.  Adrian Zmed, Eddie Bracken.

1991 (Season 73) 
 It's Delightful, It's Delovely, It's Cole Porter R
 Kiss Me, Kate 
 Hans Christian Andersen
 42nd Street
 I Do! I Do!
 Mame
 My Fair Lady

 Production featuring Jeanne Trevor.

1992 (Season 74) 
 South Pacific
 Pump Boys and Dinettes MP
 Show Boat
 The Wizard of Oz
 Hello, Dolly!
 George M! 
 The Music of Andrew Lloyd Webber MP

 Production featuring Joel Grey and Gretchen Wyler.

1993 (Season 75) 
 The Sound of Music
 Annie Get Your Gun
 Grease
 Peter Pan
 Fiddler on the Roof
 Oliver!
 Oklahoma!

1994 (Season 76) 
 The King and I
 Ain't Misbehavin' MP
 Cats
 Annie
 Seven Brides for Seven Brothers
 Meet Me in St. Louis
 The Music Man

1995 (Season 77) 
 The Music of Andrew Lloyd Webber
 An Evening of Operetta with the St. Louis Symphony C 
 Man of La Mancha
 Cinderella (Featuring  Phyllis Diller as the Stepmother, Georgia Engel as The Fairy Godmother)
 Singin' in the Rain
 Godspell
 Camelot
 West Side Story

 Production featuring a concert staging of The Merry Widow.

1996 (Season 78) 
 My Fair Lady
 Jesus Christ Superstar
 The Desert Song in Concert C
 Little Shop of Horrors
 Sleeping Beauty WP 
 Guys and Dolls
 Evita
 42nd Street

 Adaptation of the fairy tale by executive producer Paul Blake utilizing songs by Sammy Cahn.

1997 (Season 79) 
 Joseph and the Amazing Technicolor Dreamcoat
 Funny Girl
 Three Coins in the Fountain WP 
 The Wizard of Oz
 A Chorus Line 
 South Pacific
 Hello, Dolly!

 World Premiere adaptation of the 1953 film.
 Production featuring original direction and choreography recreated by Mitzi Hamilton.

1998 (Season 80) 
 Oklahoma!
 Bye Bye Birdie
 The Radio City Rockettes Muny Spectacular R 
 Peter Pan 
 Damn Yankees
 Fiddler on the Roof
 Crazy for You MP 

 Special 80th Season Revue featuring the Radio City Rockettes.
 Pre-Broadway tour featuring Cathy Rigby in the title role.
 Production featuring Bruce Adler as Bela Zangler, a role he originated in the original Broadway company.

1999 (Season 81) 
 Grease
 The King and I
 Annie
 The Muny Goes British R 
 1776
 Anything Goes 
 Meet Me in St. Louis

 Revue written by executive producer Paul Blake compiling the many works of British songwriters such as Andrew Lloyd Webber and Lionel Bart.
 Production featuring Karen Morrow as Reno Sweeney and Bruce Adler as Moonface Martin.

2000s

2000 (Season 82) 
 West Side Story (June 19-25). (featuring Sarah Uriarte Berry as Maria, Eric Kunze as Tony, Laurie Gamache as Anita, Noah Racey as Riff, David Marques as Bernardo, Raphael Alvarez as Chino, Joneal Joplin as Doc, James Anthony as Officer Krupke, Gary Glasgow as Gladhand, John Contini as Lt. Schrank, Charlie Brady as A-Rab, David Patrick Ford as Action, Aaron Douglas Smith as Big Deal, Jeffrey J. Bateman as Snowboy & Roderick Keller as Baby John) 
 An Evening of Richard Rodgers R  (July 3-9). (featuring Sarah Uriarte Berry, Walter Charles, James Clow, Leslie Denniston, Karen Morrow, Arte Phillips, Lee Roy Reams, Victoria Regan, Craig Rubano & Avery Sommers)
 The Sound of Music (July 10-16). (featuring Emily Loesser as Maria, Robert Westenberg as Captain Georg von Trapp, Jeanne Lehman as The Mother Abbess, Evan Pappas as Max Detweiler, Rachel deBenedet as Baroness Elsa Schrader, Kara Driscoll as Liesl von Trapp, David Ayers as Rolf Gruber, Jake Kohut as Friedrich von Trapp, Kaelan Sullivan as Louisa von Trapp, Patrick Probst as Kurt von Trapp, Erin Dowling as Brigitta von Trapp, Ellen Ransom as Marta von Trapp, Natalie Ann Bram as Gretl von Trapp, John Contini as Franz, Laura Ackermann as Frau Schmidt, Joneal Joplin as Admiral von Scheriber, Tom Murray as Herr Zeller, Karin Berutti as Sister Sophia, Monica Dickhens as Sister Berthe & Lynn Humphrey as Sister Margaretta)
 White Christmas WP  (July 17-23). (featuring Lara Teeter as Bob Wallace, Lee Roy Reams as Phil Davis, Karen Mason as Betty Haynes, Lauren Kennedy as Judy Haynes, Howard Keel as General Henry Waverly, Karen Morrow as Martha, Rich Pisarkiewicz as Ralph Sheldrake & Natalie A. Hall as Susan)
 A Funny Thing Happened on the Way to the Forum (July 24–30). (featuring Michael McGrath as Prologus / Pseudolus, Bruce Adler as Hysterium, Gary Holcombe as Senex, Robert Westenberg as Lycus, Michael Halling as Hero, Angela Brinton as Philia, Gina Ferrall as Domina, Nat Chandler as Miles Gloriosus, John Freimann as Erronius & Bill Brassea, Damien Brett and Jason Robinson as The Proteans)	
 Seven Brides for Seven Brothers (July 31 - August 6). (featuring James Clow as Adam Pontipee, Judy McLane as Milly, Jim T. Ruttman as Benjamin Pontipee, Erich James Polley as Caleb Pontipee, John B. Williford as Daniel Pontipee, Russell Nickerson as Ephraim Pontipee, Eduardo Flores as Frank Pontipee, Britt Freund as Gideon Pontipee, Neal Frederiksen as Mr. Bixby & Monica Dickhens as Mrs. Bixby)
 Singin' in the Rain (August 7-13). (featuring Lara Teeter as Don Lockwood, Randy Rogel as Cosmo Brown, Christina Saffran Ashford as Kathy Seldon, Nancy Ringham as Lina Lamont, Gary Holcombe as R. F. Simpson, Evan Pappas as Roscoe Dexter, Jake Kohut as Young Don Lockwood, Patrick Probst as Young Cosmo Brown, Sharon Ann Farrell as Zelda Zanders, Laura Ackermann as Dora Bailey, Jane Pisarkiewicz as Phoebe Dinsmore, John Contini as Rod Phillips, Gary Glasgow as Diction Coach, Tyler Maynard as Sound Engineer, Tom O'Brien as "Beautiful Girl" Tenor, Laurie Gamache as Female Tango Dancer / The Woman & Kevin Worley as Male Tango Dancer) 

 Revue written by executive producer Paul Blake compiling the many works of composer Richard Rodgers.
 World Premiere of the stage adaptation of Irving Berlin's classic film, directed and produced by Paul Blake.

2001 (Season 83) 
 Brigadoon (June 18-24). (featuring James Clow as Tommy Albright, Judy McLane as Fiona MacLaren, Anthony Cummings as Jeff Douglas, Victoria Clark as Meg Brockie, Eric Bourman as Harry Beaton, John Clonts as Charlie Dalrymple, Joneal Joplin as Mr. Lundie, Louise Hickey-Cadiff as Jean MacLaren, Amy Sullivan as Maggie Anderson, James Anthony as Andrew MacLaren, Gary Glasgow as Angus MacGuffie, Rich Pisarkiewicz as Archie Beaton, Kari Ely as Jane Ashton, John Contini as Stuart Dalrymple, Ken Ross as Frank & Michael Kaer Miller as Sandy Dean)
 Miss Saigon MP (June 25 - July 1). (featuring Joan Almedilla as Kim, Kevin Gray as The Engineer, Eric Kunze as Chris, Raymond Patterson as John, Edmund A. Nalzaro as Thuy, Anastasia Barzee as Ellen, Sean Bittick & Jaede Carney as Tam & Sala Iwamatsu as Gigi)
 Roman Holiday WP  (July 9-15). (featuring Jeff McCarthy as Joe Bradley, Catherine Brunell as Princess Ann, Jim Walton as Irving Radovitch, Priscilla Lopez as Francesca Cervelli, Karen Morrow as The Countess, John Freimann as Mr. Hennessy, Stellie Siteman as Social Secretary, James Anthony as The Prime Minister)
 The Wizard of Oz (July 16-22). (featuring Kate Manning as Dorothy Gale, Ozzie Smith as Professor Marvel / The Wizard of Oz, Kevin Ramsey as Hunk / The Scarecrow, Ian Knauer as Hickory / The Tin Man, Bruce Adler as Zeke / The Cowardly Lion, Toni DiBuono as Miss Gulch / The Wicked Witch of the West, Victoria Mallory as Glinda, Laura Ackermann as Aunt Em & Joneal Joplin as Uncle Henry / Guardian of the Gates)
 An Evening of Gershwin R  (July 23-29). (featuring James Clow, Harvey Evans, Mike Greensill, Pamela Isaacs, Telly Leung, Karen Morrow, Paige Price, Jim Walton & Wesla Whitfield)
 My Fair Lady (July 30 - August 5). (featuring Robert Westenberg as Henry Higgins, Kim Crosby as Eliza Doolittle, Bruce Adler as Alfred P. Doolittle, Ken Page as Colonel Pickering, Rosemary Murphy as Mrs. Higgins, Peter Flynn as Freddy Eynsford-Hill, Laura Ackermann as Mrs. Pearce, John Contini as Zolton Karparthy, Jane Pisarkiewicz as Mrs. Eynsford Hill / Mrs. Hopkins, Rich Pisarkiewicz as Lord Boxington / Jamie & Erik Nelson as Harry) 
 Evita (August 6-12). (featuring Judy McLane as Eva Perón, Daniel Cooney as Che, Raymond Jamarillo McLeod as Juan Perón, Scott Hayward as Agustín Magaldi & Kate Manning as Perón's Mistress)

 World Premiere of the stage adaptation of the film, directed and produced by Paul Blake.
 Revue written by executive producer Paul Blake compiling the many works of songwriters George and Ira Gershwin.

2002 (Season 84) 
 A Chorus Line  (June 17-23). (featuring Blane Savage as Zach, Jane Lanier as Cassie, Alec Timmerman as Larry, Matt Loehr as Mike, Susann Fletcher as Sheila, Jamie Karen as Bebe, Claci Miller as Maggie, Andrew Asnes as Al, Valerie Jane Smith as Kristine, Cindy Marchionda as Diana, Kendra Kassebaum as Val, Jon Peterson as Paul, Kim Smarsh as Connie, John Salvatore as Bobby, Jim T. Ruttman as Don, Ryan Patrick Binder as Mark, Tara Radcliffe as Judy, Benjamin Sterling Cannon as Richie & Russell Garrett as Greg) 
 Hooray for Hollywood R  (June 24-30). (featuring Nat Chandler, Mike Greensill, Pamela Isaacs, Telly Leung, Karen Morrow, Kevin Ramsey, Lee Roy Reams, Amiee Turner & Wesla Whitfield)
 How to Succeed in Business Without Really Trying (July 8-14). (featuring Michael McGrath as J. Pierrepont Finch, Claci Miller as Rosemary Pillkington, Bruce Adler as J.B. Biggley, Karen Morrow as Smitty, Stacey Logan as Hedy La Rue, Scott Schafer as Bud Frump, Joneal Joplin as Bert Bratt, Zoe Vonder Haar as Miss Jones, Gary Holcombe as Mr. Twimble, John Freimann as Wally Womper, James Anthony as Milt Gatch & Sharon Ann Farrell as Miss Krumholtz)
 Peter Pan R  (July 15-21). (featuring Valerie Wright as Peter Pan, Lee Roy Reams as Mr. Darling / Captain Hook, Rachel Hardin as Wendy Darling / Jane, Laura Ackermann as Mrs. Darling / Wendy (Grown-Up), Rich Pisarkiewicz as Mr. Smee, Eddie Szewczyk as John Darling, Christian Probst as Michael Darling, Jennifer Cody as Tiger Lily, Gretchen Bieber as Liza,  Drew Sobey as Nana, Jonathon Saia as The Crocodile, Elliot Burton as Tootles, Joey Dudding as Slightly, Ben Hosler as Curley, Brandon Bieber as Nibs, Patrick Probst as 1st Twin & Stefan Rich as 2nd Twin)
 The Fantasticks MP (July 22-28). (featuring Burke Moses as El Gallo, Christine Long as Luisa, Barrett Foa as Matt, Bruce Adler as Hucklebee, Ken Page as Bellomy, Gary Holcombe as Henry, John Freimann as Mortimer & Telly Leung as The Mute)
 Camelot (July 29 - August 4). (featuring Mark Jacoby as King Arthur, Kim Crosby as Guinevere, Nat Chandler as Lancelot, Matthew Greer as Mordred, John Sloman as King Pellinore, Joneal Joplin as Merlyn, Ray Fournie as Dinadan, Karin Berutti as Nimue & Stefan Rich as Tom of Warwick)
 Joseph and the Amazing Technicolor Dreamcoat (August 5-11). (featuring Eric Kunze as Joseph, Judy McLane as The Narrator, Anthony Cummings as The Pharaoh & James Anthony as Jacob / Potiphar)

 Production with original direction and choreography recreated by Mitzi Hamilton.
 Revue written by executive producer Paul Blake compiling songs from numerous films.
 Production directed by Thommie Walsh and choreographed by Liza Gennaro.

2003 (Season 85) 
 Fiddler on the Roof (June 16-22). (featuring Bruce Adler as Tevye, Susan Cella as Golde, Mimi Bensinger as Yente, John Preece as Lazar Wolf, Juliana Stefanov as Tzeitel, Andréa Burns as Hodel, Sara Schmidt as Chava, Daniel Reichard as Motel, Marsh Hanson as Perchik, Brad Drummer as Fyedka, Ellen Ransom as Shprintze, Olivia Threlkeld as Bielke, Rich Pisarkiewicz as Mordcha, Joneal Joplin as Rabbi, Michael Lowe as Mendel, Damien Brett as Avram, Neal Frederiksen as Nachum, Jane Pisarkiewicz as Grandma Tzeitel / Shandel, Jesse Bernath as Fruma-Sarah, John Contini as Constable & Connor Gallagher as The Fiddler)
 Side by Side by Sondheim MP (June 23-29). (featuring Ashley Brown, Lewis Cleale, Leslie Denniston, Joel Higgins, Michael McGrath, Karen Morrow, Brynn O'Malley, Matthew Scott, Barbara Walsh & Betsy Wolfe)
 Show Boat (July 7–13). (featuring Andréa Burns as Magnolia Hawks, Lewis Cleale as Gaylord Ravenal, Debbie de Coudreaux as Julie La Verne, Gary Holcombe as Cap'n Andy Hawks, Karen Morrow as Parthy Ann Hawks, Michel Bell as Joe, Jo Ann Hawkins White as Queenie, Tari Kelly as Ellie May Shipley, Eddie Korbich as Frank Schultz, James Anthony as Steve Baker, Berklea Going as Kim, Laura Schutter as Young Kim, John Freimann as Windy, Joneal Joplin as Vallon / Radio Announcer, Gary Glasgow as Jake / Jeb / Drunk, Kari Ely as Dottie / Mother Superior / First Lady in Ticket Line & Laura Ackermann as Lottie)
 Cinderella (July 14–20). (featuring Kate Manning as Cinderella, Danny Gurwin as Prince Christopher, Barbara Marineau as The Fairy Godmother, Ruth Williamson as The Stepmother, Joneal Joplin as King Maximilian, Joan Marshall as Queen Constantina, Lisa Howard as Joy, Toni DiBuono as Portia, Robert Earl Gleason as The Herald, Matthew Scott as The Stewart, Colin Donnell as Footman, Blake Ginther as Chef / Footman, Mary Carmen Catoya as Dream Cinderella & Carlos Guerra as Dream Prince Christopher)
 Godspell (July 21–27). (featuring David Burnham as Jesus, Clifton Oliver as Judas Iscariot / John the Baptist, Robert Bartley, Hunter Bell, Terri Dixon, Tobi Foster, Montego Glover, Gina Milo, Tommar Wilson & Kirsten Wyatt)
 Crazy for You (July 28 - August 3). (featuring Noah Racey as Bobby Child, Paige Price as Polly Baker, Bruce Adler as Bela Zangler, Nancy Kathryn Anderson as Irene Roth, Anthony Cummings as Lank Hawkins, John Freimann as Everett Baker, Sally Eaton as Mother (Lottie Child), James Anthony as Eugene Fodor, Kari Ely as Patricia Fodor, Sharon Ann Farrell as Tess, Damien Brett as Perkins / Pete / Wyatt, Connor Gallagher as Custus / Roof Specialty, Jerry Gallagher as Moose & Aaron J. Albano as Sam)
 South Pacific (August 4–10). (featuring Lauren Kennedy as Ensign Nellie Forbush, Charles Pistone as Emile de Becque, Wesla Whitfield as Bloody Mary, Danny Gurwin as Lt. Joseph Cable, Michael McGrath as Luther Billis, Aileen Payumo as Liat, Joneal Joplin as Capt. George Brackett, Gary Holcombe as Cdr. William Harbison, John Contini as Lt. Buzz Adams, Rich Pisarkiewicz as Stewpot, David Foley, Jr. as Professor, Alexis Boldin as Ngana & Kasey Parks as Jerome)

2004 (Season 86) 
 Meet Me in St. Louis (June 21-30). (featuring Kate Manning as Esther Smith, Berklea Going as Tootie Smith, David Burtka as John Truitt, Walter Charles as Mr. Alonzo Smith, Leslie Denniston as Mrs. Anna Smith, John Freimann as Grandpa Prophater, Georgia Engel as Katie, Ashley Brown as Rose Smith, Daniel Reichard as Lon Smith, Ellen Ransom as Agnes Smith & Betsy Wolfe as Lucille Ballard)
 Cats (July 5-11). (featuring Judy McLane as Grizabella, Ken Page as Old Deuteronomy, Jim Newman as Munkustrap, Michael Brian Dunn as Bustopher Jones / Asparagus / Growltiger, David Hibbard as Rum Tum Tugger, Patrick Mullaney as Mr. Mistoffelees, Sally Ann Swarm as Jennyanydots, Matthew Kirk as Skimbleshanks, Julie Tolivar as Bombalurina, Gayle Holsman as Demeter, Brian Collier as Mungojerrie, Mahri Relin as Rumpleteazer, Kyle McDaniel as Plato / Macavity / Rumpus Cat, Shylo Smith as Victoria, Tina Moya as Cassandra, Lauren Masiello as Sillabub, Jean Arbeiter as Jellylorum, Connor Gallagher as Tumblebrutus & Adam Walters as Alonzo)
 Annie (July 12-18). (featuring Natalie Ann Bram as Annie, Walter Charles as Oliver "Daddy" Warbucks, Ruth Williamson as Miss Hannigan, Donna English as Grace Farrell, Ian Knauer as Rooster Hannigan, Susann Fletcher as Lily St. Regis, Molly Ryan as Molly, Keely St. Peters as Pepper, Jacqueline Probst as Kate, Julia Sinks as Duffy, Anita Shastri as July, Paige Moskop as Tessie, Keldon LaVar Price as Star to Be & Anthony Cummings as FDR)
 Breakfast at Tiffany's WP (the world premiere of the stage adaptation of the film, directed and produced by Paul Blake) (July 19-25). (featuring Lauren Kennedy as Holly Golightly, Alan Campbell as Chip, Ken Page as Joe Howard, Bruce Adler as O.J. Berman, Emily Skinnner as Mag Wildwood, Joneal Joplin as Doc Golightly, Anthony Cummings as Rusty Trawler, Julio Agustin as José, Ashley Brown as Phoebe & Colin Donnell as Police Detective)
 The Music Man (July 26 - August 1). (featuring Dirk Lumbard as Harold Hill, Kim Crosby as Marian Paroo, Annie McGreevey as Mrs. Paroo, Evan Pappas as Marcellus Washburn, James Anthony as Mayor Shinn, Ruth Williamson as Eulalie MacKecknie Shinn, Jimmy McEvoy as Winthrop Paroo, Brian Letendre as Tommy Djilas, Jacqui Polk as Zanetta Shinn, Alexandra Petrullo as Amarylis, Anthony Cummings as Charlie Cowell, Rick Knight as Ewart Dunlop, Neal Frederiksen as Oliver Hix, Jim Henry as Olin Britt, Kipp Buckner as Jacey Squires, Kate Manning as Ethel Toffelmier, Laura Ackermann as Alma Hix & Libby Schueddig as Gracie Shinn)
 Guys and Dolls (August 2-8). (featuring Jeff McCarthy as Sky Masterson, Catherine Brunell as Sarah Brown, Bruce Adler as Nathan Detroit, Stacey Logan as Miss Adelaide, Wayne Pretlow as Nicely-Nicely Johnson, John Sloman as Benny Southstreet, Joneal Joplin as Arvide Abernathy, Jerry Gallagher as Big Jule, Stellie Siteman as General Matilda Cartwright, John Contini as Harry the Horse & Wayne Salomon as Lt. Brannigan)
 42nd Street (August 9–15). (featuring Mark Jacoby as Julian Marsh, Beth Leavel as Dorothy Brock, Cara Cooper as Peggy Sawyer, Leo Ash Evans as Billy Lawlor, Susann Fletcher as Maggie Jones, Joel Blum as Andy Lee, Amy Dolan as Anytime Annie, James Anthony as Pat Denning, John Freimann as Abner Dillon, John Contini as Mac, Gia Grazia Valenti as Phyllis, Tobi Foster as Lorraine & Gary Glasgow as Oscar)

2005 (Season 87) 
 Beauty and the Beast MP (June 20-29). (featuring Sarah Litzsinger as Belle, James Clow as The Beast, Nat Chandler as Gaston, Lee Roy Reams as Lumière, Bruce Adler as Cogsworth, Karen Morrow as Mrs. Potts, Ken Page as The Narrator / Maurice, David Hibbard as Lefou, Sharon Ann Farrell as Babette, Katie Pees as Madame de la Grande Bouche & Christian Probst as Chip)
 Annie Get Your Gun (July 4-10). (featuring Liz Larsen as Annie Oakley, Brian d'Arcy James as Frank Butler, Joneal Joplin as Colonel Buffalo Bill Cody, Anthony Cummings as Charlie Davenport, Bruce Adler as Chief Sitting Bull, Pamela Prescott as Dolly Tate, John Freimann as Foster Wilson, James Anthony as Pawnee Bill, Jimmy McEvoy as Little Jake & Molly Ryan as Nellie Oakley)
 Jesus Christ Superstar (July 11-17). (featuring Eric Kunze as Jesus of Nazareth, Michael K. Lee as Judas Iscariot, Andréa Burns as Mary Magdalene, Deven May as Pontius Pilate, Lawson Skala as Caiaphas, Michael Brian Dunn as Annas & Ken Page as King Herod)
 Singin' in the Rain (July 18-24). (featuring Jeffry Denman as Don Lockwood, Michael Arnold as Cosmo Brown, Meredith Patterson as Kathy Seldon, Stephanie Youell as Lina Lamont, John Freimann as R. F. Simpson, Frank Vlastnik as Roscoe Dexter, Matt Willis as Young Don Lockwood, Nick Oliveri as Young Cosmo Brown, Caitlin Carter as Zelda Zanders / The Woman / Featured Tango Couple, Kerry Conte as Dora Bailey, Jane Pisarkiewicz as Phoebe Dinsmore, Rich Pisarkiewicz as Rod Phillips, Gary Glasgow as Diction Coach / Policeman, Stacie A. Fusco as Stripper, Robert Earl Gleason as Sound Engineer, Preston Truman Boyd as "Beautiful Girl" Tenor & Stephanie Gibson as Young Woman at Party) 
 Mame (July 25-31). (featuring Dee Hoty as Mame Dennis, Beth Leavel as Vera Charles, Georgia Engel as Agnes Gooch, Christian Probst as Young Patrick Dennis, Colin Donnell as Older Patrick Dennis, Jeff McCarthy as Beauregard Jackson Pickett Burnside, Francis Jue as Ito, Joneal Joplin as Dwight Babcock, Anthony Cummings as M. Lindsay Woolsey, Annie McGreevey as Mme. Branislowski / Mother Burnside / Mrs. Upson, Christina Hammersmith as Sally Cato, Cortney Wolfson as Gloria Upson, James Anthony as Leading Man / Mr. Upson, Meggie Cansler as Art Model / Pegeen Ryan & P.J. Palmer as Peter Dennis)
 West Side Story (August 1-7). (featuring Andréa Burns as Maria, Matthew Scott as Tony, Natascia Diaz as Anita, Noah Racey as Riff, Julio Agustin as Bernardo, Raphael Alvarez as Chino, Joneal Joplin as Doc, Tom Murray as Officer Krupke, J. Scott Matthews as Gladhand, Wayne Salomon as Lt. Schrank, David Baum as A-Rab, Kevin Worley as Action, Kurt Kelly as Big Deal, Drew Humphrey as Snowboy & Dominic Roberts as Baby John) 
 The Sound of Music (August 8-14). (featuring Kate Baldwin as Maria, Robert Westenberg as Captain Georg von Trapp, Jeanne Lehman as The Mother Abbess, Danny Burstein as Max Detweiler, Leslie Denniston as Baroness Elsa Schrader, Tina Maddigan as Liesl von Trapp, Brian Letendre as Rolf Gruber, Patrick Probst as Friedrich von Trapp, Natalie Ann Bram as Louisa von Trapp, Alex Prakken as Kurt von Trapp, Ariane Rinehart as Brigitta von Trapp, Olivia Threlkeld as Marta von Trapp, Berklea Going as Gretl von Trapp, John Contini as Franz, Laura Ackermann as Frau Schmidt, James Anthony as Admiral von Scheriber, Gary Glasgow as Herr Zeller, Karin Berutti as Sister Sophia, Patricia St. James as Sister Berthe & Lynn Humphrey as Sister Margaretta)

2006 (Season 88) 
 The King and I (June 19-25). (featuring Leslie Denniston as Anna Leonowens, Francis Jue as The King of Siam, Andréa Burns as Tuptim, Paolo Montalbán as Lun Tha, Reveka Mavrovitis as Lady Thiang, Orville Mendoza as The Kralahome, P.J. Palmer as Louis Leonowens, Kasey Parks as Prince Chulalongkorn & James Anthony as Captain Orton / Sir Edward Ramsay)
 Aida MP (June 26 - July 2). (featuring Lisa Simone as Aida, Will Chase as Radames, Lisa Brescia as Amneris, Jeb Brown as Zoser, Michael James Scott as Mereb, Ken Page as Amonasro & Joneal Joplin as The Pharaoh)
 The Wizard of Oz (July 6-16). (featuring Kate Manning as Dorothy Gale, Ken Page as Professor Marvel / The Wizard of Oz, Dirk Lumbard as Hunk / The Scarecrow, Aaron Kaburick as Hickory / The Tin Man, Bruce Adler as Zeke / The Cowardly Lion, Jan Neuberger as Miss Gulch / The Wicked Witch of the West, Pamela Isaacs as Glinda, Zoe Vonder Haar as Aunt Em & Joneal Joplin as Uncle Henry / Guardian of the Gates)
 Gypsy (July 17-23). (featuring Karen Mason as Rose, Meredith Patterson as Louise, John Sloman as Herbie, Shannon M. O'Bryan as Dainty June, Kevin Worley as Tulsa, Susann Fletcher as Tessie Tura, Patti Mariano as Mazeppa, Blair Ross as Miss Cratchitt / Electra, John Contini as Pop / Cigar, Gary Glasgow as Mr. Goldstone / Weber, Robert Earl Gleason as Uncle Jocko / Bourgeron-Cochon & John Freimann as Phil / Kringelein)
 White Christmas (July 24-30). (featuring Stephen Bogardus as Bob Wallace, Dirk Lumbard as Phil Davis, Sarah Uriarte Berry as Betty Haynes, Shannon M. O'Bryan as Judy Haynes, Joneal Joplin as General Henry Waverly, Wesla Whitfield as Martha, Frank Vlastnik as Ralph Sheldrake & Berklea Going as Susan)
 Oliver! (July 31 - August 6). (featuring Bruce Adler as Fagin, Christian Probst as Oliver Twist, Jenny Powers as Nancy, Ben Crawford as Bill Sikes, Dominic Roberts as The Artful Dodger, Ken Page as Mr. Bumble, Robert Westenberg as Mr. Brownlow, Patti Mariano as Widow Corney, Gary Glasgow as Mr. Sowerberry, Kari Ely as Mrs. Sowerberry & Meggie Cansler as Bet)
 Seven Brides for Seven Brothers (August 7-13). (featuring James Clow as Adam Pontipee, Kate Baldwin as Milly, Jim T. Ruttman as Benjamin Pontipee, Drew Humphrey as Caleb Pontipee, Kevin Worley as Daniel Pontipee, Cary Tedder as Ephraim Pontipee, Colt Prattes as Frank Pontipee, Joseph Medeiros as Gideon Pontipee, Neal Frederiksen as Mr. Bixby & Zoe Vonder Haar as Mrs. Bixby)

2007 (Season 89) 
Oklahoma! (June 18-24). (featuring James Clow as Curly, Catherine Brunell as Laurey, Georgia Engel as Aunt Eller, Anthony Cummings as Jud Fry, Leah Hocking as Ado Annie Carnes, Dirk Lumbard as Will Parker, Bruce Adler as Ali Hakim, Joneal Joplin as Andrew "Papa" Carnes, Stephanie Gibson as Gertie Cummings & Rich Pisarkiewicz as Ike Skidmore)
Grease (June 25 - July 3). (featuring Kevin Kern as Danny Zuko, Shannon M. O'Bryan as Sandy Dumbrowski, Donna Vivino as Betty Rizzo, Dan Amboyer as Kenickie, Kristine Reese as Frenchy, Kristy Cates as Marty, Jaclyn Huberman as Jan, Kasey Marino as Sonny Latierri, Jason Wooten as Doody, Aaron Kaburick as Roger, Barbara Minkus as Miss Lynch, James Anthony as Vince Fontaine, Justin Keyes as Teen Angel & Meggie Cansler as Patty Simcox)
Hello, Dolly! (July 9-15). (featuring Randy Graff as Dolly Gallagher Levi, Lewis J. Stadlen as Horace Vandergelder, James Clow as Cornelius Hackl, Kate Baldwin as Irene Molloy, Telly Leung as Barnaby Tucker, Jennifer Cody as Minnie Fay, Dana Domenick as Ermengarde, Kendal Sparks as Ambrose Kemper, Ruth Pferdehirt as Ernestina, Rich Pisarkiewicz as Rudolph, Jane Pisarkiewicz as Mrs. Rose & Gary Glasgow as The Judge)
Peter Pan (July 16-22). (first production featuring a male actor, Francis Jue as Peter Pan with Robert Westenberg as Mr. Darling / Captain Hook, Heidi Dean as Wendy Darling, Kari Ely as Mrs. Darling, James Anthony as Mr. Smee, Christian Probst as John Darling, Spencer Milford as Michael Darling, Shannon M. O'Bryan as Tiger Lily, Jessica Waxman as Liza,  Berklea Going as Jane, Jesse Bernath as Nana, Ryan Huber as The Crocodile, Eddie Rowles as Tootles, Ben Hosler as Slightly, PJ Palmer as Curley, Jordan Bollwerk as Nibs, Jimmy McEvoy as 1st Twin & Drew Redington as 2nd Twin)
The Pajama Game (July 23-29). (featuring Kate Baldwin as Babe Williams, Will Chase as Sid Sorokin, Bruce Adler as Hines, Leslie Denniston as Gladys, Patti Mariano as Mabel, Joe Farrell as Prez, Jennifer Cody as Mae, Jack Friemann as Mr. Hasler, John Contini as Pop, Sara Sheperd as Brenda & Gary Glasgow as The Salesman)
Joseph and the Amazing Technicolor Dreamcoat (July 30 - August 5). (featuring Eric Kunze as Joseph, Liz Callaway as The Narrator, David Hibbard as The Pharaoh & James Anthony as Jacob / Potiphar)
Les Misérables MP (first production at the Muny; world premiere of outdoor production) (August 6-15). (featuring Ivan Rutherford as Jean Valjean, Jeff McCarthy as Javert, Lisa Simone as Fantine, Ken Page as Thénardier, Lisa Howard as Madame Thénardier, Kevin Kern as Marius, Diana Kaarina as Éponine, Leah Horowitz as Cosette, Manu Narayan as Enjolras, Jimmy McEvoy as Gavroche & Olivia Jane Prosser as Young Cosette)

2008 (Season 90) 
The Producers MP (June 16-22). (featuring Lewis J. Stadlen as Max Bialystock; Don Stephenson as Leo Bloom, Angie Schworer as Ulla, Lee Roy Reams as Roger De Bris, Anthony Cummings as Franz Liebkind & Larry Raben as Carmen Ghia)
High School Musical (June 23 - July 2). (featuring Colin Donnell as Troy Bolton, Andrea Goss as Gabriella Montez, Gretchen Bieber as Sharpay Evans, Brandon Bieber as Ryan Evans, Christopher Spaulding as Chad Danforth, Tallia Brinson as Taylor McKessie, Megan McGinnis as Kelsi Nielson, Justin Keyes as Zeke Baylor, Angeline Holmes as Martha Cox, Ann Harada as Miss Darbus & Stephen Bogardus as Coach Bolton)
My Fair Lady (July 7-13). (featuring Robert Westenberg as Henry Higgins, Catherine Brunell as Eliza Doolittle, Anthony Cummings as Alfred P. Doolittle, Joneal Joplin as Colonel Pickering, Zoe Vonder Haar as Mrs. Higgins, Daniel Reichard as Freddy Eynsford-Hill, Laura Ackermann as Mrs. Pearce, James Anthony as Zoltan Karpathy / Harry, Michele Burdette-Elmore as Mrs. Eynsford Hill / Mrs. Hopkins & Rich Pisarkiewicz as Jamie) 
90 Years of Muny Magic R (A Musical Revue Celebrating of All the Great music of The Last 90 Seasons) (July 14-20). (featuring Christian Probst as The Narrator, Michel Bell, James Clow, Kim Crosby, Erin Davie, Leslie Denniston, Francis Jue, Peter Lockyer, Dirk Lumbard, Ken Page, Meredith Patterson, Lee Roy Reams, Graham Rowat & Betsy Wolfe) 
Miss Saigon (July 21-27). (featuring Ma-Anne Dionisio as Kim, Francis Jue as The Engineer, Eric Kunze as Chris, Josh Tower as John, Michael K. Lee as Thuy, Kathy Voytko as Ellen, Sam Poon as Tam & Joanne Javien as Gigi)
My One and Only (July 28 - August 3). (featuring Dirk Lumbard as Captain Billy Buck Chandler, Meredith Patterson as Edythe Herbert, Eugene Fleming as Mr. Magix, Ken Page as Rt. Rev. J.D. Montgomery, Jeff McCarthy as Prince Nicolai, Julyana Soelistyo as Mickey, Peggy Quinn as The Reporter, Joneal Joplin as Chorus Line (Penn Station) & Robert Earl Gleason as Achmed)
Fiddler on the Roof (August 4-10). (featuring Lewis J. Stadlen as Tevye, Leslie Denniston as Golde, Barbara Minkus as Yente, James Anthony as Lazar Wolf, Jennifer Lorae as Tzeitel, Kate Manning as Hodel, Jacqui Polk as Chava, Robb Sapp as Motel, Colin Donnell as Perchik, Mike McGowan as Fyedka, Berklea Going as Shprintze, Tara Willey as Bielke, Rich Pisarkiewicz as Mordcha, John Freimann as Rabbi, Etai BenShlomo as Mendel, Tracy Baker as Avram, Neal Frederiksen as Nachum, Zoe Vonder Haar as Grandma Tzeitel / Shandel, Lora Lee Gayer and Alex Puette as Fruma-Sarah, John Contini as Constable, Jane Pisarkiewicz as Bluma (solo gossip singer), Laura Ackermann as Mirala (solo gossip singer) & Ian Joseph as The Fiddler)

2009 (Season 91) 
42nd Street (June 15-21). (featuring Robert Cuccioli as Julian Marsh, Dee Hoty as Dorothy Brock, Shannon M. O'Bryan as Peggy Sawyer, Todd Lattimore as Billy Lawlor, Patti Mariano as Maggie Jones, Bill Buell as Bert Berry, Matt Loehr as Andy Lee, Nikki Snelson as Anytime Annie, James Anthony as Pat Denning, John Freimann as Abner Dillon, John Contini as Mac, Melissa Zaremba as Phyllis, Kelly Sheehan as Lorraine & Bryan Langlitz as Oscar)
Annie (June 22-30). (featuring Abigail Isom as Annie, John Schuck as Oliver "Daddy" Warbucks, Beth Leavel as Miss Hannigan, Christianne Tisdale as Grace Farrell, Jim Newman as Rooster Hannigan, Stacey Logan as Lily St. Regis, Kelsey Knee as Molly, Stephanie Patton as Pepper, Abigail Friedmann as Kate, Sarah Koo as Duffy, Julia Schweizer as July, Gabby Glore as Tessie, Gabrielle McClinton as Star to Be & Joneal Joplin as FDR)
Meet Me in St. Louis (July 6-12). (featuring Brynn O'Malley as Esther Smith, Elizabeth Teeter as Tootie Smith, Max von Essen as John Truitt, Stephen Bogardus as Mr. Alonzo Smith, Leslie Denniston as Mrs. Anna Smith, Lewis J. Stadlen as Grandpa Prophater, Zoe Vonder Haar as Katie, Catherine Walker as Rose Smith, Robb Sapp as Lon Smith, Berklea Going as Agnes Smith & Lora Lee Gayer as Lucille Ballard)
Godspell (July 13-19). (featuring Eric Kunze as Jesus, Demond Green as Judas Iscariot / John the Baptist, Uzo Aduba, Adam Kantor, Chelsea Krombach, Tracy McDowell, Orville Mendoza, Ruth Pferdihirt, Rashida Scott & Chris Spaulding)
The Music Man (July 20-26). (featuring James Clow as Harold Hill, Kate Baldwin as Marian Paroo, Georgia Engel as Mrs. Paroo, Jeb Brown as Marcellus Washburn, James Anthony as Mayor Shinn, Donna English as Eulalie MacKecknie Shinn, Parker Donovan as Winthrop Paroo, Drew Humphrey as Tommy Djilas, Nicole Hren as Zanetta Shinn, Olivia Prosser as Amarylis, Anthony Cummings as Charlie Cowell, Rich Knight as Ewart Dunlop, Eric Dalbey as Oliver Hix, Chris Hallam as Olin Britt, Tim Waurick as Jacey Squires, Lora Lee Gayer as Ethel Toffelmier, Laura Ackermann as Alma Hix & Alyssa Wolf as Gracie Shinn)
Camelot (July 27 - August 2). (featuring Jeff McCarthy as King Arthur, Jenny Powers as Guinevere, Lewis Cleale as Lancelot, Allen E. Read as Mordred, Fred Applegate as King Pellinore, Joneal Joplin as Merlyn, Raymond Fournie as Dinadan, Justin Scott Brown as Dap & Christian Probst as Tom of Warwick)
Hairspray MP (August 3-9). (featuring Joline Mujica as Tracy Turnblad, Paul Vogt as Edna Turnblad, Lara Teeter as Wilbur Turnblad, Meggie Cansler as Penny Pingleton, Constantine Rousouli as Link Larkin, Christian White as Seaweed J. Stubbs, Charlotte Crossley as Motormouth Maybelle, Ashley Spencer as Amber Von Tussle, Susann Fletcher as Velma Von Tussle, Kasey Marino as Corny Collins, Delaney Haynes as Little Inez, Jenn Perry as Prudy Pingleton / Gym Teacher / Matron & James Anthony as Harriman F. Spritzer / Principal / Mr. Pinky)

2010s

2010 (Season 92) 
 Beauty and the Beast (June 21-30). (featuring Sarah Darling as Belle, James Clow as The Beast, Nicholas Rodriguez as Gaston, Lara Teeter as Lumière, Jeb Brown as Cogsworth, Leslie Denniston as Mrs. Potts, Ken Page as Maurice, Robb Sapp as Lefou,  Meg Gillentine as Babette, Gaelen Gilliland as Madame de la Grand Bouche & Abigail Friedman as Chip)
 Titanic  MP  (July 5-11). (featuring Tom Hewitt as Thomas Andrews, Joneal Joplin as Captain E.J. Smith, Ben Crawford as Frederick Barrett, Telly Leung as Harold Bride, Henry Stram as Henry Etches, Christian Probst as Bellboy, William Youmans as J. Bruce Ismay, Drae Page as Jack Thayer, Derek Carley as Charles Clarke, Meggie Cansler as Caroline Neville, Rich Pisarkiewicz as Edgar Beane, Michele Ragusa as Alice Beane, Jessica Grové as Kate McGowen, Justin Scott Brown as Jim Farrell, Ron Raines as Isidor Straus / 3rd Class Passenger, Claudia Catania as Ida Straus / 3rd Class Passenger, Raymond Fournie as J.J. Astor / 3rd Class Passenger / Stevedore, Robert Earl Gleason as Benjamin Guggenheim / 3rd Class Passenger, Neal Frederiksen as John B. Thayer / 3rd Class Passenger, John Meurer as George Widener / Frank Carlson / 3rd Class Passenger, Michele Burdette-Elmore as Charlotte Cardoza / 3rd Class Passenger, Gary Glasgow as 3rd Officer Herbert J. Pitman / The Major / 3rd Class Passenger & Nick Cosgrove as Frederick Fleet) 
 Damn Yankees (July 12-18). (featuring Lewis J. Stadlen as Mr. Applegate, Angie Schworer as Lola, Eric Kunze as Joe Hardy, Linda Mugleston as Meg Boyd, Leslie Kritzer as Gloria Thorpe, Walter Charles as Joe Boyd, Lee Roy Reams as Van Buren, James Anthony as Welch, Zoe Vonder Haar as Sister, John Freimann as Stadium Announcer, Alex Sanchez as Rocky, Francis Jue as Smokey, Aaron Kaburick as Sohovik & Lee Anne Mathews as Doris)
 Cats (July 19-25). (featuring Stephanie J. Block as Grizabella, Ken Page as Old Deuteronomy, Lara Teeter as Munkustrap, Michael Brian Dunn as Bustopher Jones / Asparagus / Growltiger, Kevin Loreque as Rum Tum Tugger, Joseph Medeiros as Mr. Mistoffelees, Christine Negherbon as Jennyanydots, Drew Humphrey as Skimbleshanks, Julie Tolivar as Bombalurina, Lisa Karlin as Demeter, Ryan Breslin as Mungojerrie, Lauren Masiello as Rumpleteazer, AJ Hughes as Plato / Macavity / Rumpus Cat, Sarah Marchetti as Victoria, Kiira Schmidt as Cassandra, Laura Irion as Sillabub, Heather Mieko as Jellylorum, Alex DeLeo as Tumblebrutus & Joey Dudding as Pounceable / Alonzo)
 The Sound of Music (July 26 - August 1). (featuring Ashley Brown as Maria, Tom Hewitt as Captain Georg von Trapp, Linda Mugleston as The Mother Abbess, Lewis J. Stadlen as Max Detweiler, Leslie Denniston as Baroness Elsa Schrader, Jessica Grové as Liesl von Trapp, Justin Scott Brown as Rolf Gruber, Christian Probst as Freidrich von Trapp, Berklea Going as Louisa von Trapp, Matthew Howard as Kurt von Trapp, Julia Schweizer as Brigitta von Trapp, Elizabeth Teeter as Marta von Trapp, Maria Knasel as Gretl von Trapp, John Contini as Franz, Laura Ackermann as Frau Schmidt, James Anthony as Admiral von Scheriber, Rich Pisarkiewicz as Herr Zeller, Madeline Trumble as Sister Sophia, Jane Pisarkewicz as Sister Berthe & Lynn Humphrey as Sister Margaretta)
 Footloose  MP  (August 2-8). (featuring Curtis Holbrook as Ren McCormack, Meggie Cansler as Ariel Moore, Jeff McCarthy as Rev. Shaw Moore, Dee Hoty as Vi Moore, Kevin Massey as Willard Hewitt, Cathryn Basile as Rusty, Ben Crawford as Chuck Cranston, Jennifer Prescott as Ethel McCormack, Lee Ann Mathews as Lulu Warnicker, Anthony Cummings as Wes Warnicker, Karin Berutti as Eleanore Dunbar, Robert Earl Gleason as Coach Dunbar & Gary Glasgow as Principal Clark)
 Show Boat (August 9-15). (featuring Leah Horowitz as Magnolia Hawks, Danny Gurwin as Gaylord Ravenal, Terry Burrell as Julie La Verne, Gary Beach as Cap'n Andy Hawks, Georgia Engel as Parthy Ann Hawks, Michel Bell as Joe, Jo Ann Hawkins White as Queenie, Beverly Ward as Ellie May Shipley, Kirby Ward as Frank Schultz, James Anthony as Steve Baker, Kelsey Knee as Kim, Shannon M. O'Bryan as Young Kim, Nick Cosgrove as Windy, Anthony Cummings as Vallon, John Riddle as Jeb / Drunk / Radio Announcer, Michele Burdette-Elmore as Mother Superior, Michael Horsely as Jake, Samantha Massell as Lottie & Gia Grazie Valenti as Dottie)

2011 (Season 93) 
 Legally Blonde  MP (June 20–26). (featuring Lauren Zakrin as Elle Woods, D. B. Bonds as Emmett Forrest, Lisa Howard as Paulette, Ken Land as Professor Callahan, Matthew Hydzik as Warner Huntington III, Sara Sheperd as Vivienne Kensington, Nikki Snelson as Brooke Wyndham, Taylor Louderman as Margot, Tiffany Engen as Serena, K. B. Hart as Pilar, Michelle Rombola as Kate / Chutney, Lili Froehlich as District Attorney, Madeline Trumble as Enid, Stephanie Cain as Stenographer, Brené Jackson as Store Manager / Judge, Julie Probst as Mom, Colt Prattes as Grandmaster Chad /Dewey / Kyle, Robert Earl Gleason as Dad / Winthrop / Reporter, Charles Osborne as Pforzheimer, Sam Lips as Lowell/Carlos, Matthew Steffens as Padamadan/Nikos & John Riddle as Aaron)
 Kiss Me, Kate (June 27 – July 3). (featuring Tom Hewitt as Fred Graham / Petruchio, Lisa Vroman as Lilli Vanessi / Katherine, Andrea Chamberlain as Lois Lane / Bianca, Curtis Holbrook as Bill Calhoun / Lucentio, John Schuck as First Man, Lee Roy Reams as Second Man,  Joneal Joplin as Harry Trevor / Baptista, James Anthony as Harrison Howell, Max Kumangai as Paul, Zoe Vonder Haar as Hattie, Eric Santagata as Gremio, Andy Jones as Hortensio, Kenny Metzger as Ralph, Rich Pisarkiewicz as John, Patrick Ross as Cab Driver & Patrick Ross as Haberdasher)
 The Little Mermaid  MP  (July 6–14) (nine nights). (featuring Patti Murin as Ariel, Paul Vogt as Ursula, John Riddle as Prince Eric, Francis Jue as Sebastian, Ken Page as King Triton, Lara Teeter as Scuttle, Elizabeth Teeter as Flounder, Gary Glasgow as Grimsby, Lee Roy Reams as Chef Louis, Matt Braver as Flotsam, Max Kumangai as Jetsam, Madeline Trumble as Carlotta & Sam Lips as Pilot)
 Singin' in the Rain (July 18–24). (featuring Tony Yazbeck as Don Lockwood, Curtis Holbrook as Cosmo Brown, Shannon M. O'Bryan as Kathy Seldon, Michele Ragusa as Lina Lamont, James Anthony as R. F. Simpson, John Freimann as Roscoe Dexter, Matthew Howard as Young Don Lockwood, Rexford C. Calkins as Young Cosmo Brown, Chelsea Wilson as Stripper, Amy Blackman as Dora Bailey, Kelly Sheehan as Zelda Zanders, Rich Pisarkiewicz as Rod Phillips, Julian Decker as Policeman, Laura Ackermann as Phoebe Dinsmore, John Contini as Diction Coach, Cara Salerno as Olga Mara, Graydon Long as Sound Engineer, Patrick Ross as "Beautiful Girl" Tenor & Kelly O'Neill as Woman at Post Premiere Party)
 Little Shop of Horrors (July 25–31). (featuring Rob McClure as Seymour Krelborn, Alli Mauzey as Audrey, Raye Birk as Mr. Mushnik, Clarke Thorell as Orin Scrivello DDS / Bernstein / Mrs. Luce / Snip / Others, Ken Page as Audrey II (Voice), Jen Brissman as Ronnette, Alysha Deslorieux as Crystal, Brené Jackson as Chiffon & Michael Latini as Audrey II (Puppeteer))
 Seven Brides for Seven Brothers (August 1–7). (featuring James Clow as Adam Pontipee, Jenny Powers as Milly, Colt Prattes as Benjamin Pontipee, Cameron Hobbs as Celeb Pontipee, Eric Santagata as Daniel Pontipee, Drew Humphrey as Ephraim Pontipee, Sam Lips as Frank Pontipee, Andy Jones as Gideon Pontipee, Neal Frederiksen as Mr. Bixby, Michelle Rombola as Mrs. Bixby, Gary Glasgow as The Preacher & John Contini as Mr. Perkins)
 Bye Bye Birdie (August 8–14). (featuring Lara Teeter as Albert Peterson, Andréa Burns as Rose Alvarez, Parker Pogue as Conrad Birdie, Susan Cella as Mae Peterson, Kelly O'Neill as Kim MacAfee, Lewis J. Stadlen as Mr. Harry MacAfee, Leslie Denniston as Mrs. Doris MacAfee, Samantha Massell as Ursula Merkle, Michael Harp as Randolph MacAfee, Julian Decker as Hugo Peabody, Kelly Sheehan as Gloria Rasputin, Alysha Deslorieux as Alice, James Anthony as The Mayor, Candice M. Coleman as The Mayor's Wife, Jane Pisarkiewicz as Mrs. Merkle & Rich Pisarkiewicz as Charles F. Maude)

Instead of the usual Monday-Sunday run, The Little Mermaid ran from Wednesday through Thursday of the following week.

2012 (Season 94) 
 Thoroughly Modern Millie MP (June 18–24). (featuring Tari Kelly as Millie Dillmount, Andrew Samonsky as Jimmy Smith, Beth Leavel as Mrs. Meers, Leslie Uggams as Muzzie Van Hossmere, Stephen R. Buntrock as Mr. Trevor Graydon, Megan McGinnis as Miss Dorothy Brown, Francis Jue as Ching Ho, Darren Lee as Bun Foo & Tory Ross as Miss Flannery)
 Chicago MP  (June 25 – July 1). (featuring Patti Murin as Roxie Hart, Natascia Diaz as Velma Kelly, Justin Guarini as Billy Flynn, Dean Christopher as Amos Hart, Jackie Hoffman as Matron "Mama" Morton & Patti Cohenour as Mary Sunshine)
 Aladdin MP  (July 5–13) (nine nights). (featuring Robin de Jesús as Aladdin, Samantha Massell as Princess Jasmine, John Tartaglia as The Genie, Thom Sesma as Jafar, Curtis Holbrook as Iago, Ken Page as the Sultan, Eddie Korbich as Babkak, Jason Graae as Omar & Francis Jue as Kassim)
 Dreamgirls MP (July 16–22). (featuring Jennifer Holliday as Effie Melody White, Demetria McKinney as Deena Jones, Christopher Jackson as Curtis Taylor Jr., Milton Craig Nealy as James "Thunder" Early, Jenelle Lynn Randall as Lorrell Robinson, Tommar Wilson as C. C. White, Ken Page as Marty Madison & Karla Mosely as Michelle Morris)
 Joseph and the Amazing Technicolor Dreamcoat (July 23–29). (featuring Justin Guarini as Joseph, Mamie Parris as The Narrator, Austin Miller as The Pharaoh & Gary Glasgow as Jacob / Potiphar)
 Pirates! (or, Gilbert & Sullivan Plunder'd) MP  (July 30 – August 5). (featuring Hunter Foster as The Pirate King, Ed Dixon as Major-General Stanley, Jay Armstrong Johnson is Frederic, Analisa Leaming is Mabel, Kathy Fitzgerald as Ruth, Alan Mingo Jr. as The Sergeant, Jon Rua as Samuel, Emily Trumble as Isabel, Katie Johannigman as Edith, Tory Ross as Kate, Cassie Levine as Jane, Alexandra Ferrara as Pippa & Audrey McHale as Cornelia)
 The King and I (August 6–12). (featuring Laura Michelle Kelly as Anna Leonowens, Kevin Gray as The King of Siam, Stephanie Park as Tuptim, Joshua Dela Cruz as Lun Tha, Joan Almedilla as Lady Thiang, Alan Ariano as The Kralahome, Matt Johnson as Louis Leonowens, Nick Boivin as Prince Chulalongkorn & Michael James Reed as Captain Orton / Sir Edward Ramsay)

When Chicago was presented in 1977, it was the Broadway production which had just closed in New York.  This production was billed as the "Muny production premiere."Instead of the normal Monday-Sunday run, Aladdin ran from Thursday through Friday of the following week.  This was only the third production of the stage version of Aladdin anywhere in the world.A version of Gilbert and Sullivan's The Pirates of Penzance.

2013 (Season 95) 

 Monty Python's Spamalot MP  (June 17–23). (featuring John O'Hurley as King Arthur, Michele Ragusa as The Lady of the Lake, Chris Hoch as Sir Lancelot / The French Taunter / Knight of Ni / Tim the Enchanter,  John Scherer as Sir Robin / Guard 1 / Brother Maynard, David Hibbard as Patsy / Guard 2,  Ben Davis as Sir Dennis Galahad / The Black Knight / Prince Herbert’s Father, Tally Sessions as Dennis’ Mother / Sir Bedevere / Mayor / Concorde, Kevin Cahoon as Historian / Not Dead Fred / French Guard / Minstrel / Prince Herbert & Bob Costas as The Voice of God)
 Shrek The Musical MP  (June 24–30).  {featuring Stephen Wallem as Shrek, Michael James Scott as Donkey, Julia Murney as Princess Fiona, Rob McClure as Lord Farquaad, Anthony Christian Daniel as Pinocchio, Natalie Venetia Belcon as Dragon, Maria Knasel as Young Fiona & Allison Broadhurst as Teen Fiona)
 Nunsense Muny Style! MP  (July 1–7). (featuring Dee Hoty as Reverend Mother Mary Regina, Phyllis Smith as Sister Julia, Child of God, Tari Kelly as Sister Mary Amnesia, Beth Leavel as Sister Robert Anne, Sarah Meahl as Sister Mary Leo, Terri White as Sister Mary Hubert, Ken Page as Sister Mary Wilhelm, Lara Teeter as Father Virgil, Rachel Abrams as Sister Mary Luke & Michele Burdette Elmore as Sister Mary Brendan)
 South Pacific (July 8–14). (featuring Laura Michelle Kelly as Ensign Nellie Forbush, Ben Davis as Emile de Becque, Loretta Ables Sayre as Bloody Mary, Josh Young as Lt. Joseph Cable, Tally Sessions as Luther Billis, Sumie Maeda as Liat, James Anthony as Capt. George Brackett, Michael James Reed as Cdr. William Harbison, Greg Roderick as Lt. Buzz Adams, Ryan Andes as Stewpot, Scott Anthony Joy as Professor, Caitlin Chau as Ngana & Spencer Jones as Jerome) 
 Les Misérables (July 15–21). (featuring Hugh Panaro as Jean Valjean, Norm Lewis as Javert, Charlotte Maltby as Fantine, Michael McCormick as Monsieur Thénardier, Tiffany Green as Madame Thénardier, Alex Prakken as Marius, Lindsey Mader as Éponine, Katie Travis as Cosette, Bobby Conte Thornton as Enjolras, Jimmy Coogan as Gavroche & Lilly Kanterman as Young Cosette)
 Mary Poppins MP  (July 25 – August 2) (nine nights). (featuring Jenny Powers as Mary Poppins, Rob McClure as Bert, Stephen R. Buntrock as George Banks, Erin Dilly as Winifred Banks,  Elizabeth Teeter as Jane Banks, Aidan Gemme as Michael Banks, James Anthony as Admiral Boom / Bank Chairman, Zoe Vonder Haar as Mrs. Brill, Anthony Christian Daniel as Robertson Ay, Laura Ackermann as The Bird Woman & Rebecca Finnegan as Katie Nana / Queen Victoria / Miss Smythe / Mrs. Corry / Miss Andrew)
 West Side Story (August 5–11). (featuring Ali Ewoldt as Maria, Kyle Dean Massey as Tony, Natalie Cortez as Anita, Curtis Holbrook as Riff, Manuel Herrera as Bernardo, Jon Rua as Chino, Ken Page as Doc, Rich Pisarkiewicz as Officer Krupke, Gary Glasgow as Gladhand, Michael James Reed as Lt. Schrank, Sam Rogers as A-Rab, Drew Foster as Action, Travis Waldschmidt as Big Deal, Kyle Coffman as Snowboy & Brandon Hudson as Baby John)

Instead of the usual Monday-Sunday run, Mary Poppins ran from Thursday to Friday of the following week.

2014 (Season 96) 
 Billy Elliot the Musical MP  (June 16–22). (featuring Tade Biesinger as Billy Elliot, Emily Skinner as Mrs. Wilkinson, Daniel Oreskes as Dad, Patti Perkins as Grandma, Ben Nordstrom as Tony, Michael Harp as Michael, Maria Knasel as Debbie, Paul Aguirre as Mr. Braithwaite, Steve Isom as George, Molly Garner as Mum & Maximilien A. Baud as Older Billy)
 Tarzan MP  (June 25 – July 2). (featuring Nicholas Rodriguez as Tarzan, Kate Rockwell as Jane Porter, Quentin Earl Darrington as Kerchak, Katie Thompson as Kala, Gregory Haney as Terk, Ken Page as Professor Porter, Michael James Reed as Clayton, Spencer Jones as Young Tarzan & Nathaniel Mahone as Young Terk.
 Porgy and Bess (July 7–13). (featuring Nathaniel Stampley as Porgy, Alicia Hall Moran as Bess, Kingsley Leggs as Sportin' Life, Alvin Crawford as Crown, Denisha Ballew as Serena, David Hughey as Jake, Sumayya Ali as Clara & Danielle Lee Greaves as Mariah)
 The Addams Family MP  (July 14–20). (featuring Rob McClure as Gomez Addams, Jenny Powers as Morticia Addams, Steve Rosen as Uncle Fester, Sara Kapner as Wednesday Addams, John Scherer as Mal Beineke, Hollis Resnik as Alice Beineke, Dan DeLuca as Lucas Beineke, Jennifer Cody as Grandma Addams, Michael Harp as Pugsley Addams & William Ryall as Lurch)
 Seussical MP  (July 22–28). (featuring John Tartaglia as The Cat in the Hat, Stephen Wallem as Horton the Elephant, Reuben Thomas as Jojo, Kirsten Wyatt as Gertrude McFuzz, Julia Murney as Mayzie LaBird, Liz Mikel as Sour Kangaroo, James Anthony as General Genghis Kahn Schmitz, Gary Glasgow as The Mayor of Whoville, April Strelinger as Mrs. Mayor & Raymond J. Lee, Blakely Slaybaugh and Omari Tau as The Wickersham Brothers)
 Grease (July 31 – August 8). (featuring Brandon Espinoza as Danny Zuko, Taylor Louderman as Sandy Dumbrowski, Arianda Fernandez as Betty Rizzo, Drew Foster as Kenickie, Madison Johnson as Frenchy, Natalie Kaye Clater as Marty, Amelia Jo Parish as Jan, L'ogan J'ones as Sonny Latierri, Tyler Bradley Indyck as Doody, Larry Owens as Roger, Phyllis Smith as Miss Lynch, Matthew Saldivar as Vince Fontaine, Teressa Kindle as Teen Angel & Rhiannon Hansen as Patty Simcox)
 Hello, Dolly! (August 11–17). (featuring Beth Leavel as Dolly Gallagher Levi, John O'Hurley as Horace Vandergelder, Rob McClure as Cornelius Hackl, Mamie Parris as Irene Molloy, Jay Armstrong Johnson as Barnaby Tucker, Eloise Kropp as Minnie Fay, Berklea Going as Ermengarde, Daniel Berryman as Ambrose Kemper, April Strelinger as Ernestina & Rich Pisarkiewicz as Rudolph / The Judge)

Eight nights, Wednesday through Wednesday.
Tuesday through Monday.
Nine nights, Thursday through Friday.

2015 (Season 97) 
 My Fair Lady (June 15–21). (featuring Anthony Andrews as Henry Higgins, Alexandra Silber as Eliza Doolittle, Michael McCormick as Alfred P. Doolittle, Paxton Whitehead as Colonel Pickering, Zoe Vonder Haar as Mrs. Higgins, Matthew Scott as Freddy Eynsford-Hill, Peggy Billo as Mrs. Pearce, Anna Blair as Mrs. Eynsford Hill, Steve Isom as Jamie, Rich Pisarkiewicz as Harry, Lori Barrett-Pagano as Mrs. Hopkins)
 Hairspray (June 23–30). (featuring Ryann Redmond as Tracy Turnblad, Bryan Batt as Edna Turnblad, Lara Teeter as Wilbur Turnblad, Charlotte Maltby as Penny Pingleton, John Battagliese as Link Larkin, Gerald Caesar as Seaweed J. Stubbs, Liz Mikel as Motormouth Maybelle, Taylor Louderman as Amber Von Tussle, Heather Ayers as Velma Von Tussle, Christopher Hanke as Corny Collins, Kennedy Holmes as Little Inez, Jenn Harris as Prudy Pingleton / Gym Teacher / Matron & Bob Amaral as Harriman F. Spritzer / Principal / Mr. Pinky)
 Holiday Inn MP  (July 6–12). (featuring Colin Donnell as Jim Hardy, Noah Racey as Ted Hanover, Patti Murin as Linda Mason, Holly Ann Butler as Lila Dixon, Nancy Opel as Louise Badger, Danny Rutigliano as Danny Reed & Phoenix Lawson as Charlie Winslow)
 Buddy: The Buddy Holly Story MP  (July 13–19). (featuring Andy Christopher as Buddy Holly, Nicholas Rodriguez as Ritchie Valens, John Scherer as Hipockets Duncan, Jo Lynn Burks as Vi Petty, Joe Cosmo Cogen as Jerry Allison, Christopher Ryan Grant as The Big Bopper, Ben Nordstrom as Clearlake MC, Michael James Reed as Norman Petty, Sharone Sayegh María Elena & Sam Weber as Joe B. Mauldin)
 Into the Woods MP  (July 21–27). (featuring Heather Headley as The Witch, Erin Dilly as The Baker's Wife, Rob McClure as The Baker, Ken Page as The Narrator, Andrew Samonsky as The Wolf / Cinderella's Prince, Elena Shaddow as Cinderella, Sara Kapner as Little Red Riding Hood, Jason Gotay as Jack, Zoe Vonder Haar as Jack’s Mother, Michael McCormick as Cinderella's Father / The Mysterious Man, Samantha Massell as Rapunzel, Ryan Silverman as Rapunzel's Prince, Ellen Harvey as Cinderella’s Stepmother, Anna Blair as Cinderella's Mother / Grandma, Gary Glasgow as The Steward, April Strelinger as Lucinda, Jennifer Diamond as Florinda & Maggie Lakis as Milky White)
 Beauty and the Beast (July 29 – August 7). (featuring Kate Rockwell as Belle, Nicholas Rodriguez as The Beast, Nathaniel Hackmann as Gaston, Rob McClure as Lumière, Steve Rosen as Cogsworth, Marva Hicks as Mrs. Potts, Lenny Wolpe as Maurice, Michael Hartung as Lefou,  Deidre Goodwin as Babette, Heather Jane Rolff as Madame de la Grand Bouche & Spencer Jones as Chip)
 Oklahoma! (August 10–16). (featuring Ben Davis as Curly, Christine Cornish Smith as Laurey, Beth Leavel as Aunt Eller, Alexander Gemignani as Jud Fry, Jenni Barber as Ado Annie Carnes, Clyde Alves as Will Parker, Nehal Joshi as Ali Hakim, Shaver Tillitt as Andrew "Papa" Carnes, Audrey Kennedy as Gertie Cummings & Drew Battles as Ike Skidmore)

2016 (Season 98) 
 The Wizard of Oz (June 13–22). (featuring Danielle Bowen as Dorothy Gale, P. J. Benjamin as Professor Marvel / The Wizard of Oz, Kevin Cahoon as Hunk / The Scarecrow, Nicholas Rodriguez as Hickory / The Tin Man, Stephen Wallem as Zeke / The Cowardly Lion, Peggy Roeder as Miss Gulch / The Wicked Witch of the West, Leah Berry as Glinda & Lynn Humphrey as Aunt Em)
 42nd Street (June 24–30). (featuring Shuler Hensley as Julian Marsh, Emily Skinner as Dorothy Brock, Jonalyn Saxer as Peggy Sawyer, Jay Armstrong Johnson as Billy Lawlor, Ann Harada as Maggie Jones, Jason Kravits as Bert Berry, Bryan Thomas Hunt as Andy Lee, Megan Sikora as Anytime Annie, Joey Sorge as Pat Denning, Fred Zimmerman as Abner Dillon, Patrick Blindauer as Mac & Rich Pisarkiewicz as Oscar)
 The Music Man (July 5–11). (featuring Hunter Foster as Harold Hill, Elena Shaddow as Marian Paroo, Liz McCartney as Mrs. Paroo, Todd Buonopane as Marcellus Washburn, Mark Linn-Baker as Mayor Shinn, Nancy Anderson as Eulalie MacKecknie Shinn, Owen Hanford as Winthrop Paroo, Colby Dezelick as Tommy Djilas, Halli Toland as Zanetta Shinn, Greta Clark as Amarylis, Michael James Reed as Charlie Cowell, Adam Halpin as Ewart Dunlop, Ben Nordstrom as Oliver Hix, Joseph Torello as Olin Britt, J.D. Daw as Jacey Squires, Elizabeth Ann Berg as Ethel Toffelmier & April Strelinger as Alma Hix)
 Young Frankenstein MP  (July 13–19). (featuring Robert Petkoff as Dr. Frederick Frankenstein, Stephanie Gibson as Inga, Steve Rosen as Igor, Vicki Lewis as Frau Blucher, Jennifer Cody as Elizabeth, Timothy Hughes as The Monster & John Scherer as Inspector Kemp / Hermit)
 Mamma Mia! MP  (July 21–28). (featuring Julia Murney as Donna Sheridan, Brittany Zeinstra as Sophie Sheridan, Ann Harada as Rosie, Jenny Powers as Tanya, Justin Guarini as Sam Carmichael, Ben Nordstrom as Harry Bright, Mike McGowan as Bill Austin & Jason Gotay as Sky)
 Fiddler on the Roof (July 30 – August 5). (featuring Michael McCormick as Tevye, Anne L. Nathan as Golde, Nancy Opel as Yente / Fruma-Sarah, Peter Van Wagner as Lazar Wolf, Haley Bond as Tzeitel, Briana Carlson-Goodman as Hodel, Carly Blake Sebouhian as Chava, Alan Schmuckler as Motel, Marrick Smith as Perchik, Colby Dezelick as Fyedka, Emma Resek as Shprintze, Elise Edwards as Bielke, Jeremy Vogel as Mordcha, Jeremy Lawrence as Rabbi, Adam J. Levy as Mendel, Gary Glasgow as Avram, Randall Dodge as Nachum, Zoe Vonder Haar as Grandma Tzeitel, Michael James Reed as Constable & Andrew Ross Crowe as The Fiddler)   
 Aida (August 8–14). (featuring Michelle Williams as Aida, Zak Resnick as Radames, Taylor Louderman as Amneris, Patrick Cassidy as Zoser, Wonza Johnson as Mereb, Ken Page as Amonasro & Lara Teeter as The Pharaoh)

2017 (Season 99) 
 Jesus Christ Superstar (June 12–18). (featuring Bryce Ryness as Jesus of Nazareth, Constantine Maroulis as Judas Iscariot, Ciara Renée as Mary Magdalene, Ben Davis as Pontius Pilate, Nicholas Ward as Caiaphas, Mykal Kilgore as Annas & Christopher Sieber as King Herod)
 The Little Mermaid (June 20–29). (featuring Emma Degerstedt as Ariel, Emily Skinner as Ursula, Jason Gotay as Prince Eric, James T. Lane as Sebastian, Jerry Dixon as King Triton, Jeffrey Schecter as Scuttle, Spencer Jones as Flounder, Richard B. Watson as Grimsby, Frank Vlastnik as Chef Louis / Pilot, Kevin Zak as Flotsam & Will Porter as Jetsam)
 A Funny Thing Happened on the Way to the Forum (July 5–11). (featuring Jeffrey Schecter as Prologus / Pseudolus, John Tartaglia as Hysterium, Mark Linn-Baker as Senex, Jason Kravits as Lycus, Marrick Smith as Hero, Ali Ewoldt as Philia, E. Faye Butler as Domina, Nathaniel Hackmann as Miles Gloriosus, Whit Reichert as Erronius & Marcus Choi, Justin Keyes and Tommy Scrivens as The Proteans)	
 All Shook Up  MP  (July 13–19). (featuring Tim Rogan as Chad, Caroline Bowman as Natalie Haller / Ed, Barrett Riggins as Dennis, Lara Teeter as Jim Haller, Liz Mikel as Sylvia, Felicia Finley as Miss Sandra, Hollis Resnik as Mayor Matilda Hyde, Ciara Alyse Harris as Lorraine, Jerry Vogel as Sheriff Earl & Paul Schwensen as Dean Hyde)
 The Unsinkable Molly Brown (July 21–27). (featuring Beth Malone as Molly Tobin, Marc Kudisch as Johnny J. Brown, Whitney Bashor as Julia, Paolo Montalbán as Arthur, Justin Guarini as Vincenzo & David Abeles as Erich)
 A Chorus Line (July 29 – August 4). (featuring Ivan Hernandez as Zach, Bianca Marroquín as Cassie, John T. Wolfe as Larry, Sean Harrison Jones as Mike, Holly Ann Butler as Sheila, Caley Crawford as Bebe, Bronwyn Tarboton as Maggie, Rick Faugno as Al, Madison Johnson as Kristine, Hannah Florence as Diana, Mackenzie Bell as Val, Ian Paget as Paul, Jolina Javier as Connie, Evan Kinnane as Bobby, Justin Prescott as Don, Drew Redington as Mark, Kiira Schmidt as Judy, Sharrod Williams as Richie & Victor Wisehart as Greg) 
 Newsies  MP  (August 7–13). (featuring Jay Armstrong Johnson as Jack Kelly, Davis Gaines as Joseph Pulitzer, Tessa Grady as Katherine Plumber, Ta'Rea Campbell as Medda Larkin, Daniel Quadrino as Crutchie, Spencer Davis Milford as Davey Jacobs & Gabriel Cytron as Les Jacobs)

2018 (Season 100) 
 May 18, 2018. "An Evening With the Stars"
This one-night-only production had a cast of 100, with special performances by show business legends Chita Rivera and Tommy Tune, along with Broadway and Muny stars Patrick Cassidy, Ken Page, Jenny Powers, Lara Teeter and Graham Rowat. Co-Hosted by Tony® and Grammy® Award-winning artist Heather Headley and Tony®, Emmy® and Golden Globe® Award-nominated artist Matthew Morrison, "An Evening with the Stars" was uniquely created for this historic birthday and it celebrated the rich and diverse history of musical theatre at The Muny over the past century.

The Regular Season
 Jerome Robbins' Broadway  MP  (June 11–17). (featuring Rob McClure as The Setter from Overture / Emcee from On the Town / Pa from High Button Shoes / Tevye from Fiddler on the Roof / Floy from High Button Shoes, Jenny Powers as Hildy from On the Town / Monotony Singer from Miss Liberty, Garen Scribner as Gaby from On the Town / Tony from West Side Story / Monotony Clarinet, Tanairi Vazquez as Anita from West Side Story, Sarah Marie Jenkins as Peter Pan from Peter Pan / Grandma Tzeitel from Fiddler on the Roof, Maggie Lakis as Ma from High Button Shoes / Golde from Fiddler on the Roof, Drew Redington as Chip from On the Town, Davis Wayne as Riff from West Side Story, Sarah Bowden as Claire from On the Town / Tuptim from The King and I / Fruma-Sarah from Fiddler on the Roof / Mama Crook from High Button Shoes, Leeds Hill as Ozzie from On the Town, Erica Wong as Eliza from The King and I, Elizabeth Teeter as Wendy Darling from Peter Pan, Sean Rozanski as Bernardo from West Side Story/ Monotony Soloist Trombone, Peter Chursin as King Simon from The King and I, Alexa De Barr as Maria from West Side Story / Monotony Soloist, Cole Joyce as John Darling from Peter Pan, Gabriel Cytron as Michael Darling from Peter Pan, Jess Fry as Angel / George from The King and I, Kyle Coffman as A-Rab from West Side Story / The Fiddler from Fiddler on the Roof, Evan Kinnane as Motel from Fiddler on the Roof, Hillary Porter as Rosalia from West Side Story / Tzeitel from Fiddler on the Roof, Bethany Tesarck as Ivy Smith from On the Town, Victor Wisehart as Lazar Wolf from Fiddler on the Roof & Jennifer Ferry as Somewhere Soloist from West Side Story)
 The Wiz (June 19–25). (featuring Danyel Fulton as Dorothy Gale, Nathan Lee Graham as The Wiz, Jared Grimes as The Scarecrow, James T. Lane as The Tinman, Darius de Haas as The Lion, Demetria McKinney as Aunt Em / Glinda, E. Faye Butler as Addaperle / Evillene, Sir Brock Warren as Gatekeeper / Monkey Leader & Nathaniel J. Washington as Head Winkie)
 Singin' in the Rain (June 27 – July 3). (featuring Corbin Bleu as Don Lockwood, Jeffrey Schecter as Cosmo Brown, Berklea Going as Kathy Seldon, Megan Sikora as Lina Lamont, Jeff McCarthy as R. F. Simpson, George Merrick as Roscoe Dexter, Ryan Washington as Young Don Lockwood, Ben Iken as Young Cosmo Brown, Lizz Picini as Stripper / Girl in the Green Dress, Debby Lennon as Dora Bailey / Phoebe Dinsmore, Halle Morse as Zelda Zanders, Patrick Blindauer as Rod Phillips, Cayel Tregeagle as Policeman, Gary Glasgow as Diction Coach, Emma Gassett as Olga Mara, Evan Kinnane as Sound Engineer, Ward Billeisen as "Beautiful Girl" Tenor & Kaitlin Nelson as Woman at Post Premiere Party) 
 Jersey Boys MP (July 9–16). (featuring Mark Ballas as Frankie Valli, Nicolas Dromard as Tommy DeVito, Bobby Conte Thornton as Bob Gaudio, Keith Hines as Nick Massi, Neal Benari as Gyp DeCarlo, Nicholas Rodriguez as Bob Crewe, Michelle Aravena as Mary Delgado, Tommy Martinez as Joe Pesci, Ben Nordstrom as Nick DeVito / Norm Waxman, Candi Boyd as Frankie’s Mother / Miss Frankie Nolan / Lorraine & Carissa Massaro as Angel / Francine)
 Annie (July 18–25). (featuring Peyton Ella as Annie, Christopher Sieber as Oliver “Daddy’” Warbucks, Jennifer Simard as Miss Hannigan, Britney Coleman as Grace Farrell, Jon Rua as Rooster Hannigan, Holly Ann Butler as Lily St. Regis, Ana McAlister as Molly, Samantha Iken as Pepper, Ella Grace Roberts as Kate, Trenay LaBelle as Duffy, Amanda Willingham as July, Madeline Domian as Tessie, Abigail Isom as Star to Be & John Scherer as FDR) 
 Gypsy (July 27 – August 2). (featuring Beth Leavel as Rose, Julia Knitel as Louise, Adam Heller as Herbie, Hayley Podschun as Dainty June, Drew Redington as Tulsa, Jennifer Cody as Miss Cratchitt / Tessie Tura, Ellen Harvey as Mazeppa, Ann Harada as Electra, Kip Niven as Pop / Cigar / Detroit Announcer, Michael James Reed as Weber / Bougeron-Cochon / Detroit Announcer / Mr. Goldstone / Philadelphia Announcer & Lara Teeter as Uncle Jocko / Phil Minsky’s / Announcer)
 Meet Me in St. Louis (August 4–12). (featuring Emily Walton as Esther Smith, Elena Adams as Tootie Smith, Dan DeLuca as John Truitt, Stephen R. Buntrock as Mr. Alonzo Smith, Erin Dilly as Mrs. Anna Smith, Ken Page as Grandpa Prophater, Kathy Fitzgerald as Katie, Liana Hunt as Rose Smith, Jonathan Burke as Lon Smith, Elle Wesley as Agnes Smith & Madison Johnson as Lucille Ballard)

2019 (Season 101) 
 Guys and Dolls (June 10–16). (featuring Ben Davis as Sky Masterson, Brittany Bradford as Sarah Brown, Jordan Gelber as Nathan Detroit, Kendra Kassebaum as Miss Adelaide, Orville Mendoza as Nicely-Nicely Johnson, Jared Gertner as Benny Southstreet, Ken Page as Arvide Abernathy, Brendan Averett as Big Jule, Zoe Vonder Haar as General Matilda Cartwright, Kevin Cahoon as Harry the Horse & Rich Pisarkiewicz as Lt. Brannigan)
 Kinky Boots  MP  (June 19–25). (featuring Graham Scott Fleming as Charlie Price, J. Harrison Ghee as Lola, Taylor Louderman as Lauren, Caroline Bowman as Nicola, Paul Whitty as Don, John Scherer as George, Holly Davis as Pat, Jenn Perry as Trish, Ross Lekites as Harry, Patrick Oliver Jones as Mr. Price, Omega Jones as Simon Sr., Anthony Sagaria as Richard Bailey, Victor Landon as Young Charlie & Khaydn M. Adams as Young Lola)
 1776 (June 27 – July 3). (featuring Robert Petkoff as John Adams, Adam Heller as Benjamin Franklin, Keith Hines as Thomas Jefferson, Ben Davis as John Dickinson, Ryan Andes as Richard Henry Lee, Bobby Conte Thornton as Edward Rutledge, Jenny Powers as Abigail Adams, Ali Ewoldt as Martha Jefferson, Joneal Joplin as Stephen Hopkins, Michael James Reed as John Hancock, Greg Roderick as Roger Sherman, Harry Bouvy as Andrew McNair, J.D. Daw as Robert Livingston, Patrick Blindauer as Samuel Chase, George Abud as James Wilson, Michael Thomas Holmes as George Read, Philip Hoffman as Caesar Rodney, Gary Glasgow as Charles Thomson, Larry Mabrey as Lewis Morris, Jerry Vogel as John Witherspoon, Brian Keane as Thomas McKean, Reed Armstrong as Lyman Hall, Ben Nordstrom as Josiah Bartlett, Dean Christopher as Joseph Hewes, Benjamin Love as Leather Apron	 & Alex Prakken as Courier) 
 Rodgers and Hammerstein's Cinderella (July 8–16). (featuring Mikaela Bennett as Ella, Jason Gotay as Prince Topher, Ashley Brown as Marie, Alison Fraser as Madame, Stephanie Gibson as Gabrielle, Jennifer Cody as Charlotte, John Scherer as Sebastian, Chad Burris as Jean-Michel & Victor Ryan Robertson as Lord Pinkleton)
 Footloose (July 18–24). (featuring Mason Reeves as Ren McCormack, McKenzie Kurtz as Ariel Moore, Jeremy Kushnier as Rev. Shaw Moore, Heather Ayers as Vi Moore, Eli Mayer as Willard Hewitt, Khailah Johnson as Rusty, Andrew Alstat as Chuck Cranston, Darlesia Cearcy as Ethel McCormack, NaTasha Yvette Williams as Lulu Warnicker, Aaron Kaburick as Wes Warnicker, Rebecca Young as Eleanore Dunbar, Patrick Blindauer as Coach Dunbar, Jerry Vogel as Principal Clark, Maggie Kuntz as Urleen & Katja Rivera Yanko as Wendy Jo)
 Paint Your Wagon (July 27 – August 2). (featuring Matt Bogart as Ben Rumson, Mamie Parris as Cayla Woodling, Omar Lopez-Cepero as Armando, Mark Evans as William, Maya Keleher as Jennifer Rumson, Allan K. Washington as Wesley, Andrew Kober as Jake, Austin Ku as Ming-Li, Raymond J. Lee as Guang-Li, Rodney Hicks as H. Ford & Michael James Reed as Craig Woodling)
 Matilda the Musical  MP  (August 5–11). (featuring Mattea Conforti as Matilda Wormwood, Beth Malone as Miss Agatha Trunchbull, Laura Michelle Kelly as Miss Jennifer Honey, Josh Grisetti as Mr. Wormwood, Ann Harada as Mrs. Wormwood, Darlesia Cearcy as Mrs. Phelps, Trevor Michael Schmidt as Michael Wormwood, Sean Ewing as Rodolpho, Colby Dezelick as The Escapologist, Gabi Stapula as The Acrobat, Ryan Fitzgerald as Sergei, Ella Grace Roberts as Lavender, Owen Hanford as Bruce, Ana McAlister as Amanda, Trenay LaBelle as Hortensia, Victor Landon as Nigel, Elliott Campbell as Eric, Ava Castro as Alice & Spencer Donovan Jones as Tommy)

2020s 
2020 (Season 102) Cancelled due to COVID-19.

It was scheduled to feature Chicago • (June 15–21); Mary Poppins • (June 24 – July 2); Sweeney Todd: The Demon Barber of Fleet Street • (July 6–12); Smokey Joe's Cafe  •  (July 14–20); The Sound of Music  • (July 23–29); On Your Feet! • (August 1–7); Seven Brides for Seven Brothers • (August 10–16)

2021 (Season 103) 
 Smokey Joe's CafeMP (July 26 – August 1). (featuring Charl Brown, Michael Campayno, Mykal Kilgore, Tiffany Mann, Hayley Podschun, Dee Roscioli, Christopher Sams, Nasia Thomas & Jason Veasey)
 The Sound of Music (August 3–8). (featuring Kate Rockwell as Maria, Michael Hayden as Captain Georg von Trapp, Bryonha Marie Parham as The Mother Abbess, John Scherer as Max Detweiler, Jenny Powers as Baroness Elsa Schrader, Elizabeth Teeter as Liesl von Trapp, Andrew Alstat as Rolf Gruber, Victor de Paula Rocha as Freidrich von Trapp, Amelie Lock as Louisa von Trapp, Parker Dzuba as Kurt von Trapp, Jillian Depke as Brigitta von Trapp, Abby Hogan as Marta von Trapp, Kate Scarlett Kappel as Gretl von Trapp, David Hess as Franz, April Strelinger as Frau Schmidt, Jerry Vogel as Admiral von Scheriber, Michael James Reed as Herr Zeller, Beth Kirkpatrick as Sister Sophia, Andrea Jones-Sojola as Sister Berthe & Leah Berry as Sister Margaretta)
 Seven Brides for Seven Brothers (August 12–18). (featuring Edward Watts as Adam Pontipee, Kendra Kassebaum as Milly, Harris Milgrim as Benjamin Pontipee, Waldemar Quinones-Villanueva as Celeb Pontipee, Ryan Steele as Daniel Pontipee, Garett Hawe as Ephraim Pontipee, Kyle Coffman as Frank Pontipee, Brandon L. Whitmore as Gideon Pontipee, Rebecca Young as Mrs. Bixby & Rich Pisarkiewicz as The Preacher)
 On Your Feet! MP (August 21–27). (featuring Arianna Rosario as Gloria Estefan, Omar Lopez-Cepero as Emilio Estefan, Natascia Diaz as Gloria Fajardo, Alma Cuervo as Consuelo García, Lee Zarrett as Phil, Isabella Iannelli as Little Gloria & Jordan Vergara as Nayib / Young Emilio / Jeremy)    
 Chicago (August 30 – September 5). (featuring Sarah Bowden as Roxie Hart, J. Harrison Ghee as Velma Kelly, James T. Lane as Billy Flynn, Adam Heller as Amos Hart, Emily Skinner as Matron "Mama" Morton & Ali Ewoldt as Mary Sunshine)

2022 (Season 104) 
 Chicago (June 13–19). (featuring Sarah Bowden as Roxie Hart, J. Harrison Ghee as Velma Kelly, James T. Lane as Billy Flynn, Adam Heller as Amos Hart, Emily Skinner as Matron "Mama" Morton & Ali Ewoldt as Mary Sunshine)
 Camelot (June 22–28). (featuring Robert Petkoff as King Arthur, Shereen Pimentel as Guinevere, Brandon Chu as Lancelot, Barrett Riggins as Mordred, Evan Ruggiero as Sir Dinadan, Daryl Tofa as Sir Lionel, Sarah Quinn Taylor as Sir Sagramore & Riley Carter Adams as Tom of Warwick)
 Mary Poppins (July 5–13). (featuring Jeanna de Waal as Mary Poppins, Corbin Bleu as Bert, Nehal Joshi as George Banks, Erin Davie as Winifred Banks, Laila Fantroy as Jane Banks, Gabe Cytron as Michael Banks, Whit Reichert as Admiral Boom / Bank Chairman, Zoe Vonder Haar as Mrs. Brill, Barrett Riggins as Robertson Ay, Alesia Cearcy as The Bird Woman, Debby Lennon as Queen Victoria / Miss Andrew & Jade Jones as Katie Nana / Miss Smythe / Mrs. Corry)
 Sweeney Todd: The Demon Barber of Fleet StreetMP (July 16-22). (featuring Ben Davis as Sweeney Todd, Carmen Cusack as Mrs. Lovett, Robert Cuccioli as Judge Turpin, Lincoln Clauss as Tobias Ragg, Jake Boyd as Anthony Hope, Riley Noland as Johanna, Julie Hanson as The Beggar Woman, Stephen Wallem as Beadle Bamford, Harnando Umana as Adolfo Pirelli & Price Waldman as Jonas Fogg) 
 Legally Blonde (July 25–31). (featuring Kyla Stone as Elle Woods, Fergie L. Philippe as Emmett Forrest, Patti Murin as Paulette, Sean Allan Krill as Professor Callahan, Dan Tracy as Warner Huntington III, Olivia Kaufmann as Vivienne Kensington, Hayley Podschun as Brooke Wyndham, Kelsey Anne Brown as Margot, Gabi Campo as Serena, Khailah Johnson as Pilar & Kerri George as Enid)
 The Color Purple MP (August 3–9). (featuring Anastacia McCleskey as Celie, Tracee Beazer as Shug Avery, Nicole Michelle Haskins as Sofia, Gilbert Domally as Harpo, Evan Tyrone Martin as Mister & Nasia Thomas as Nettie)
 Joseph and the Amazing Technicolor Dreamcoat (August 12–18). (featuring Jason Gotay as Joseph, Jessica Vosk as The Narrator, Mykal Kilgore as The Pharaoh & Eric Jordan Young as Jacob / Potiphar)

2023 (Season 105) 
 Beautiful: The Carole King MusicalMP (June 12-18).
 Beauty and the Beast (June 22-30).
 ChessMP (July 5-11).
 West Side Story (July 15-21).
 Little Shop of Horrors (July 25-31).
 RentMP (August 4-10).
 Sister ActMP (August 14-20).

Sources 
 The Muny 1993 75th Season Souvenir Program
 Muny archival records
 www.muny.org

References 

Theatres in Missouri
Buildings and structures in St. Louis
Tourist attractions in St. Louis